

138001–138100 

|-bgcolor=#fefefe
| 138001 ||  || — || February 4, 2000 || Socorro || LINEAR || EUT || align=right | 1.3 km || 
|-id=002 bgcolor=#E9E9E9
| 138002 ||  || — || February 4, 2000 || Socorro || LINEAR || — || align=right | 2.0 km || 
|-id=003 bgcolor=#fefefe
| 138003 ||  || — || February 4, 2000 || Socorro || LINEAR || — || align=right | 1.6 km || 
|-id=004 bgcolor=#fefefe
| 138004 ||  || — || February 4, 2000 || Socorro || LINEAR || MAS || align=right | 1.6 km || 
|-id=005 bgcolor=#E9E9E9
| 138005 ||  || — || February 4, 2000 || Socorro || LINEAR || — || align=right | 3.2 km || 
|-id=006 bgcolor=#fefefe
| 138006 ||  || — || February 4, 2000 || Socorro || LINEAR || LCI || align=right | 1.9 km || 
|-id=007 bgcolor=#E9E9E9
| 138007 ||  || — || February 4, 2000 || Socorro || LINEAR || — || align=right | 2.0 km || 
|-id=008 bgcolor=#E9E9E9
| 138008 ||  || — || February 4, 2000 || Socorro || LINEAR || EUN || align=right | 3.5 km || 
|-id=009 bgcolor=#E9E9E9
| 138009 ||  || — || February 10, 2000 || Kitt Peak || Spacewatch || — || align=right | 3.9 km || 
|-id=010 bgcolor=#fefefe
| 138010 ||  || — || February 10, 2000 || Kitt Peak || Spacewatch || — || align=right | 1.6 km || 
|-id=011 bgcolor=#fefefe
| 138011 ||  || — || February 10, 2000 || Kitt Peak || Spacewatch || — || align=right | 1.5 km || 
|-id=012 bgcolor=#fefefe
| 138012 ||  || — || February 12, 2000 || Kitt Peak || Spacewatch || — || align=right | 1.8 km || 
|-id=013 bgcolor=#FFC2E0
| 138013 ||  || — || February 8, 2000 || Socorro || LINEAR || APO +1km || align=right | 3.5 km || 
|-id=014 bgcolor=#fefefe
| 138014 ||  || — || February 8, 2000 || Socorro || LINEAR || — || align=right | 1.6 km || 
|-id=015 bgcolor=#fefefe
| 138015 ||  || — || February 5, 2000 || Catalina || CSS || — || align=right | 1.9 km || 
|-id=016 bgcolor=#fefefe
| 138016 Kerribeisser ||  ||  || February 6, 2000 || Kitt Peak || M. W. Buie || — || align=right | 1.3 km || 
|-id=017 bgcolor=#fefefe
| 138017 ||  || — || February 8, 2000 || Kitt Peak || Spacewatch || NYS || align=right data-sort-value="0.92" | 920 m || 
|-id=018 bgcolor=#fefefe
| 138018 ||  || — || February 10, 2000 || Kitt Peak || Spacewatch || ERI || align=right | 2.6 km || 
|-id=019 bgcolor=#fefefe
| 138019 ||  || — || February 3, 2000 || Socorro || LINEAR || — || align=right | 1.4 km || 
|-id=020 bgcolor=#fefefe
| 138020 ||  || — || February 11, 2000 || Socorro || LINEAR || NYS || align=right | 1.3 km || 
|-id=021 bgcolor=#fefefe
| 138021 ||  || — || February 2, 2000 || Socorro || LINEAR || NYS || align=right | 1.5 km || 
|-id=022 bgcolor=#fefefe
| 138022 ||  || — || February 2, 2000 || Socorro || LINEAR || V || align=right | 1.1 km || 
|-id=023 bgcolor=#E9E9E9
| 138023 ||  || — || February 4, 2000 || Socorro || LINEAR || — || align=right | 3.3 km || 
|-id=024 bgcolor=#E9E9E9
| 138024 ||  || — || February 3, 2000 || Kitt Peak || Spacewatch || — || align=right | 1.5 km || 
|-id=025 bgcolor=#E9E9E9
| 138025 ||  || — || February 4, 2000 || Kitt Peak || Spacewatch || — || align=right | 1.4 km || 
|-id=026 bgcolor=#E9E9E9
| 138026 || 2000 DR || — || February 24, 2000 || Oizumi || T. Kobayashi || — || align=right | 2.6 km || 
|-id=027 bgcolor=#fefefe
| 138027 ||  || — || February 23, 2000 || Polino || Polino Obs. || — || align=right | 1.5 km || 
|-id=028 bgcolor=#E9E9E9
| 138028 ||  || — || February 26, 2000 || Kitt Peak || Spacewatch || — || align=right | 2.2 km || 
|-id=029 bgcolor=#fefefe
| 138029 ||  || — || February 27, 2000 || Olathe || Olathe || — || align=right | 1.3 km || 
|-id=030 bgcolor=#fefefe
| 138030 ||  || — || February 28, 2000 || Socorro || LINEAR || — || align=right | 1.7 km || 
|-id=031 bgcolor=#C2FFFF
| 138031 ||  || — || February 26, 2000 || Kitt Peak || Spacewatch || L4 || align=right | 12 km || 
|-id=032 bgcolor=#d6d6d6
| 138032 ||  || — || February 26, 2000 || Kitt Peak || Spacewatch || — || align=right | 3.8 km || 
|-id=033 bgcolor=#E9E9E9
| 138033 ||  || — || February 27, 2000 || Kitt Peak || Spacewatch || — || align=right | 2.1 km || 
|-id=034 bgcolor=#E9E9E9
| 138034 ||  || — || February 29, 2000 || Socorro || LINEAR || HNS || align=right | 3.0 km || 
|-id=035 bgcolor=#fefefe
| 138035 ||  || — || February 29, 2000 || Socorro || LINEAR || H || align=right | 1.1 km || 
|-id=036 bgcolor=#fefefe
| 138036 ||  || — || February 29, 2000 || Socorro || LINEAR || — || align=right | 1.2 km || 
|-id=037 bgcolor=#E9E9E9
| 138037 ||  || — || February 28, 2000 || Socorro || LINEAR || — || align=right | 2.2 km || 
|-id=038 bgcolor=#E9E9E9
| 138038 ||  || — || February 29, 2000 || Socorro || LINEAR || — || align=right | 2.2 km || 
|-id=039 bgcolor=#E9E9E9
| 138039 ||  || — || February 29, 2000 || Socorro || LINEAR || MAR || align=right | 1.8 km || 
|-id=040 bgcolor=#fefefe
| 138040 ||  || — || February 29, 2000 || Socorro || LINEAR || NYS || align=right | 1.1 km || 
|-id=041 bgcolor=#fefefe
| 138041 ||  || — || February 29, 2000 || Socorro || LINEAR || V || align=right | 1.7 km || 
|-id=042 bgcolor=#E9E9E9
| 138042 ||  || — || February 29, 2000 || Socorro || LINEAR || — || align=right | 2.8 km || 
|-id=043 bgcolor=#fefefe
| 138043 ||  || — || February 29, 2000 || Socorro || LINEAR || MAS || align=right | 1.0 km || 
|-id=044 bgcolor=#E9E9E9
| 138044 ||  || — || February 29, 2000 || Socorro || LINEAR || — || align=right | 4.2 km || 
|-id=045 bgcolor=#fefefe
| 138045 ||  || — || February 29, 2000 || Socorro || LINEAR || NYS || align=right | 1.0 km || 
|-id=046 bgcolor=#fefefe
| 138046 ||  || — || February 29, 2000 || Socorro || LINEAR || — || align=right | 1.1 km || 
|-id=047 bgcolor=#E9E9E9
| 138047 ||  || — || February 29, 2000 || Socorro || LINEAR || — || align=right | 3.8 km || 
|-id=048 bgcolor=#E9E9E9
| 138048 ||  || — || February 29, 2000 || Socorro || LINEAR || — || align=right | 3.0 km || 
|-id=049 bgcolor=#fefefe
| 138049 ||  || — || February 29, 2000 || Socorro || LINEAR || — || align=right | 1.7 km || 
|-id=050 bgcolor=#fefefe
| 138050 ||  || — || February 29, 2000 || Socorro || LINEAR || MAS || align=right | 1.1 km || 
|-id=051 bgcolor=#fefefe
| 138051 ||  || — || February 29, 2000 || Socorro || LINEAR || — || align=right | 2.2 km || 
|-id=052 bgcolor=#fefefe
| 138052 ||  || — || February 29, 2000 || Socorro || LINEAR || V || align=right | 1.2 km || 
|-id=053 bgcolor=#E9E9E9
| 138053 ||  || — || February 29, 2000 || Socorro || LINEAR || — || align=right | 2.3 km || 
|-id=054 bgcolor=#E9E9E9
| 138054 ||  || — || February 29, 2000 || Socorro || LINEAR || — || align=right | 4.9 km || 
|-id=055 bgcolor=#E9E9E9
| 138055 ||  || — || February 29, 2000 || Socorro || LINEAR || — || align=right | 1.6 km || 
|-id=056 bgcolor=#fefefe
| 138056 ||  || — || February 29, 2000 || Socorro || LINEAR || — || align=right | 1.5 km || 
|-id=057 bgcolor=#E9E9E9
| 138057 ||  || — || February 29, 2000 || Socorro || LINEAR || MAR || align=right | 2.0 km || 
|-id=058 bgcolor=#fefefe
| 138058 ||  || — || February 29, 2000 || Socorro || LINEAR || — || align=right | 1.9 km || 
|-id=059 bgcolor=#fefefe
| 138059 ||  || — || February 29, 2000 || Socorro || LINEAR || — || align=right | 1.8 km || 
|-id=060 bgcolor=#E9E9E9
| 138060 ||  || — || February 29, 2000 || Socorro || LINEAR || — || align=right | 2.7 km || 
|-id=061 bgcolor=#fefefe
| 138061 ||  || — || February 29, 2000 || Socorro || LINEAR || — || align=right | 1.4 km || 
|-id=062 bgcolor=#fefefe
| 138062 ||  || — || February 29, 2000 || Socorro || LINEAR || NYS || align=right data-sort-value="0.99" | 990 m || 
|-id=063 bgcolor=#E9E9E9
| 138063 ||  || — || February 29, 2000 || Socorro || LINEAR || HEN || align=right | 1.6 km || 
|-id=064 bgcolor=#E9E9E9
| 138064 ||  || — || February 29, 2000 || Socorro || LINEAR || — || align=right | 1.8 km || 
|-id=065 bgcolor=#fefefe
| 138065 ||  || — || February 29, 2000 || Socorro || LINEAR || NYS || align=right | 1.2 km || 
|-id=066 bgcolor=#E9E9E9
| 138066 ||  || — || February 29, 2000 || Socorro || LINEAR || — || align=right | 2.5 km || 
|-id=067 bgcolor=#fefefe
| 138067 ||  || — || February 29, 2000 || Socorro || LINEAR || MAS || align=right | 1.6 km || 
|-id=068 bgcolor=#E9E9E9
| 138068 ||  || — || February 29, 2000 || Socorro || LINEAR || — || align=right | 2.7 km || 
|-id=069 bgcolor=#d6d6d6
| 138069 ||  || — || February 29, 2000 || Socorro || LINEAR || — || align=right | 7.2 km || 
|-id=070 bgcolor=#fefefe
| 138070 ||  || — || February 29, 2000 || Socorro || LINEAR || NYS || align=right | 1.3 km || 
|-id=071 bgcolor=#E9E9E9
| 138071 ||  || — || February 29, 2000 || Socorro || LINEAR || — || align=right | 2.3 km || 
|-id=072 bgcolor=#E9E9E9
| 138072 ||  || — || February 29, 2000 || Socorro || LINEAR || — || align=right | 1.3 km || 
|-id=073 bgcolor=#d6d6d6
| 138073 ||  || — || February 29, 2000 || Socorro || LINEAR || — || align=right | 1.9 km || 
|-id=074 bgcolor=#E9E9E9
| 138074 ||  || — || February 29, 2000 || Socorro || LINEAR || — || align=right | 3.0 km || 
|-id=075 bgcolor=#fefefe
| 138075 ||  || — || February 29, 2000 || Socorro || LINEAR || NYS || align=right | 1.5 km || 
|-id=076 bgcolor=#E9E9E9
| 138076 ||  || — || February 29, 2000 || Socorro || LINEAR || — || align=right | 4.6 km || 
|-id=077 bgcolor=#fefefe
| 138077 ||  || — || February 29, 2000 || Socorro || LINEAR || NYS || align=right | 1.4 km || 
|-id=078 bgcolor=#E9E9E9
| 138078 ||  || — || February 29, 2000 || Socorro || LINEAR || NEM || align=right | 3.7 km || 
|-id=079 bgcolor=#E9E9E9
| 138079 ||  || — || February 29, 2000 || Socorro || LINEAR || — || align=right | 2.3 km || 
|-id=080 bgcolor=#fefefe
| 138080 ||  || — || February 29, 2000 || Socorro || LINEAR || — || align=right | 1.8 km || 
|-id=081 bgcolor=#E9E9E9
| 138081 ||  || — || February 29, 2000 || Socorro || LINEAR || — || align=right | 1.9 km || 
|-id=082 bgcolor=#E9E9E9
| 138082 ||  || — || February 29, 2000 || Socorro || LINEAR || — || align=right | 1.6 km || 
|-id=083 bgcolor=#E9E9E9
| 138083 ||  || — || February 29, 2000 || Socorro || LINEAR || — || align=right | 4.1 km || 
|-id=084 bgcolor=#E9E9E9
| 138084 ||  || — || February 29, 2000 || Socorro || LINEAR || — || align=right | 2.4 km || 
|-id=085 bgcolor=#fefefe
| 138085 ||  || — || February 29, 2000 || Socorro || LINEAR || NYS || align=right | 1.3 km || 
|-id=086 bgcolor=#E9E9E9
| 138086 ||  || — || February 29, 2000 || Socorro || LINEAR || — || align=right | 1.5 km || 
|-id=087 bgcolor=#E9E9E9
| 138087 ||  || — || February 29, 2000 || Socorro || LINEAR || — || align=right | 2.4 km || 
|-id=088 bgcolor=#E9E9E9
| 138088 ||  || — || February 29, 2000 || Socorro || LINEAR || — || align=right | 1.9 km || 
|-id=089 bgcolor=#E9E9E9
| 138089 ||  || — || February 29, 2000 || Socorro || LINEAR || MAR || align=right | 1.9 km || 
|-id=090 bgcolor=#fefefe
| 138090 ||  || — || February 29, 2000 || Socorro || LINEAR || NYS || align=right | 1.5 km || 
|-id=091 bgcolor=#E9E9E9
| 138091 ||  || — || February 29, 2000 || Socorro || LINEAR || VIB || align=right | 4.4 km || 
|-id=092 bgcolor=#E9E9E9
| 138092 ||  || — || February 29, 2000 || Socorro || LINEAR || — || align=right | 4.7 km || 
|-id=093 bgcolor=#E9E9E9
| 138093 ||  || — || February 29, 2000 || Socorro || LINEAR || — || align=right | 3.1 km || 
|-id=094 bgcolor=#E9E9E9
| 138094 ||  || — || February 29, 2000 || Socorro || LINEAR || — || align=right | 3.9 km || 
|-id=095 bgcolor=#FFC2E0
| 138095 ||  || — || February 26, 2000 || Socorro || LINEAR || AMO +1kmmoon || align=right | 2.3 km || 
|-id=096 bgcolor=#E9E9E9
| 138096 ||  || — || February 28, 2000 || Socorro || LINEAR || — || align=right | 3.8 km || 
|-id=097 bgcolor=#fefefe
| 138097 ||  || — || February 28, 2000 || Socorro || LINEAR || NYS || align=right | 1.5 km || 
|-id=098 bgcolor=#fefefe
| 138098 ||  || — || February 28, 2000 || Socorro || LINEAR || — || align=right | 1.6 km || 
|-id=099 bgcolor=#E9E9E9
| 138099 ||  || — || February 28, 2000 || Socorro || LINEAR || — || align=right | 2.2 km || 
|-id=100 bgcolor=#fefefe
| 138100 ||  || — || February 29, 2000 || Socorro || LINEAR || NYS || align=right data-sort-value="0.98" | 980 m || 
|}

138101–138200 

|-bgcolor=#E9E9E9
| 138101 ||  || — || February 29, 2000 || Socorro || LINEAR || — || align=right | 2.0 km || 
|-id=102 bgcolor=#fefefe
| 138102 ||  || — || February 27, 2000 || Kitt Peak || Spacewatch || — || align=right | 1.3 km || 
|-id=103 bgcolor=#fefefe
| 138103 ||  || — || February 27, 2000 || Kitt Peak || Spacewatch || — || align=right | 1.3 km || 
|-id=104 bgcolor=#E9E9E9
| 138104 ||  || — || February 27, 2000 || Kitt Peak || Spacewatch || MIS || align=right | 4.0 km || 
|-id=105 bgcolor=#E9E9E9
| 138105 ||  || — || February 28, 2000 || Socorro || LINEAR || — || align=right | 4.0 km || 
|-id=106 bgcolor=#E9E9E9
| 138106 ||  || — || February 29, 2000 || Socorro || LINEAR || CLO || align=right | 5.1 km || 
|-id=107 bgcolor=#fefefe
| 138107 ||  || — || February 29, 2000 || Socorro || LINEAR || — || align=right | 1.8 km || 
|-id=108 bgcolor=#E9E9E9
| 138108 ||  || — || February 29, 2000 || Socorro || LINEAR || WAT || align=right | 3.9 km || 
|-id=109 bgcolor=#fefefe
| 138109 ||  || — || February 29, 2000 || Socorro || LINEAR || — || align=right | 2.0 km || 
|-id=110 bgcolor=#fefefe
| 138110 ||  || — || February 29, 2000 || Socorro || LINEAR || — || align=right | 1.2 km || 
|-id=111 bgcolor=#E9E9E9
| 138111 ||  || — || February 29, 2000 || Socorro || LINEAR || — || align=right | 1.7 km || 
|-id=112 bgcolor=#E9E9E9
| 138112 ||  || — || February 29, 2000 || Socorro || LINEAR || — || align=right | 2.9 km || 
|-id=113 bgcolor=#E9E9E9
| 138113 ||  || — || February 27, 2000 || Fair Oaks Ranch || J. V. McClusky || HNS || align=right | 2.1 km || 
|-id=114 bgcolor=#E9E9E9
| 138114 ||  || — || February 27, 2000 || Catalina || CSS || — || align=right | 1.4 km || 
|-id=115 bgcolor=#E9E9E9
| 138115 ||  || — || February 26, 2000 || Kitt Peak || Spacewatch || — || align=right | 2.0 km || 
|-id=116 bgcolor=#fefefe
| 138116 || 2000 EZ || — || March 3, 2000 || Socorro || LINEAR || — || align=right | 4.9 km || 
|-id=117 bgcolor=#E9E9E9
| 138117 ||  || — || March 3, 2000 || Socorro || LINEAR || — || align=right | 1.7 km || 
|-id=118 bgcolor=#fefefe
| 138118 ||  || — || March 1, 2000 || Tebbutt || F. B. Zoltowski || NYS || align=right | 1.8 km || 
|-id=119 bgcolor=#E9E9E9
| 138119 ||  || — || March 2, 2000 || Kitt Peak || Spacewatch || — || align=right | 2.0 km || 
|-id=120 bgcolor=#E9E9E9
| 138120 ||  || — || March 2, 2000 || Kitt Peak || Spacewatch || MAR || align=right | 1.8 km || 
|-id=121 bgcolor=#fefefe
| 138121 ||  || — || March 3, 2000 || Socorro || LINEAR || MAS || align=right data-sort-value="0.98" | 980 m || 
|-id=122 bgcolor=#d6d6d6
| 138122 ||  || — || March 4, 2000 || Socorro || LINEAR || — || align=right | 3.4 km || 
|-id=123 bgcolor=#E9E9E9
| 138123 ||  || — || March 4, 2000 || Socorro || LINEAR || KRM || align=right | 4.3 km || 
|-id=124 bgcolor=#E9E9E9
| 138124 ||  || — || March 4, 2000 || Socorro || LINEAR || — || align=right | 1.5 km || 
|-id=125 bgcolor=#fefefe
| 138125 ||  || — || March 4, 2000 || Socorro || LINEAR || V || align=right | 1.6 km || 
|-id=126 bgcolor=#E9E9E9
| 138126 ||  || — || March 4, 2000 || Socorro || LINEAR || MAR || align=right | 2.4 km || 
|-id=127 bgcolor=#FFC2E0
| 138127 ||  || — || March 4, 2000 || Socorro || LINEAR || ATE +1kmPHA || align=right data-sort-value="0.75" | 750 m || 
|-id=128 bgcolor=#E9E9E9
| 138128 ||  || — || March 3, 2000 || Socorro || LINEAR || — || align=right | 3.0 km || 
|-id=129 bgcolor=#fefefe
| 138129 ||  || — || March 3, 2000 || Socorro || LINEAR || — || align=right | 1.5 km || 
|-id=130 bgcolor=#E9E9E9
| 138130 ||  || — || March 5, 2000 || Socorro || LINEAR || — || align=right | 2.3 km || 
|-id=131 bgcolor=#FA8072
| 138131 ||  || — || March 3, 2000 || Catalina || CSS || — || align=right | 1.8 km || 
|-id=132 bgcolor=#E9E9E9
| 138132 ||  || — || March 3, 2000 || Catalina || CSS || EUN || align=right | 2.7 km || 
|-id=133 bgcolor=#fefefe
| 138133 ||  || — || March 5, 2000 || Socorro || LINEAR || H || align=right data-sort-value="0.93" | 930 m || 
|-id=134 bgcolor=#fefefe
| 138134 ||  || — || March 3, 2000 || Kitt Peak || Spacewatch || NYS || align=right | 1.2 km || 
|-id=135 bgcolor=#E9E9E9
| 138135 ||  || — || March 8, 2000 || Kitt Peak || Spacewatch || — || align=right | 2.0 km || 
|-id=136 bgcolor=#E9E9E9
| 138136 ||  || — || March 4, 2000 || Socorro || LINEAR || — || align=right | 2.8 km || 
|-id=137 bgcolor=#E9E9E9
| 138137 ||  || — || March 5, 2000 || Socorro || LINEAR || — || align=right | 1.5 km || 
|-id=138 bgcolor=#E9E9E9
| 138138 ||  || — || March 5, 2000 || Socorro || LINEAR || — || align=right | 2.0 km || 
|-id=139 bgcolor=#E9E9E9
| 138139 ||  || — || March 8, 2000 || Socorro || LINEAR || — || align=right | 3.2 km || 
|-id=140 bgcolor=#E9E9E9
| 138140 ||  || — || March 8, 2000 || Socorro || LINEAR || — || align=right | 1.3 km || 
|-id=141 bgcolor=#E9E9E9
| 138141 ||  || — || March 9, 2000 || Socorro || LINEAR || — || align=right | 1.8 km || 
|-id=142 bgcolor=#E9E9E9
| 138142 ||  || — || March 9, 2000 || Tebbutt || F. B. Zoltowski || EUN || align=right | 2.2 km || 
|-id=143 bgcolor=#fefefe
| 138143 ||  || — || March 9, 2000 || Kitt Peak || Spacewatch || H || align=right data-sort-value="0.80" | 800 m || 
|-id=144 bgcolor=#E9E9E9
| 138144 ||  || — || March 8, 2000 || Socorro || LINEAR || — || align=right | 1.9 km || 
|-id=145 bgcolor=#fefefe
| 138145 ||  || — || March 10, 2000 || Socorro || LINEAR || — || align=right | 2.3 km || 
|-id=146 bgcolor=#E9E9E9
| 138146 ||  || — || March 10, 2000 || Socorro || LINEAR || — || align=right | 1.4 km || 
|-id=147 bgcolor=#E9E9E9
| 138147 ||  || — || March 10, 2000 || Socorro || LINEAR || — || align=right | 1.3 km || 
|-id=148 bgcolor=#fefefe
| 138148 ||  || — || March 10, 2000 || Socorro || LINEAR || NYS || align=right | 1.4 km || 
|-id=149 bgcolor=#E9E9E9
| 138149 ||  || — || March 10, 2000 || Socorro || LINEAR || — || align=right | 1.4 km || 
|-id=150 bgcolor=#E9E9E9
| 138150 ||  || — || March 10, 2000 || Socorro || LINEAR || — || align=right | 1.5 km || 
|-id=151 bgcolor=#E9E9E9
| 138151 ||  || — || March 10, 2000 || Socorro || LINEAR || — || align=right | 3.1 km || 
|-id=152 bgcolor=#E9E9E9
| 138152 ||  || — || March 10, 2000 || Socorro || LINEAR || — || align=right | 1.6 km || 
|-id=153 bgcolor=#E9E9E9
| 138153 ||  || — || March 10, 2000 || Socorro || LINEAR || — || align=right | 1.4 km || 
|-id=154 bgcolor=#E9E9E9
| 138154 ||  || — || March 10, 2000 || Socorro || LINEAR || XIZ || align=right | 2.6 km || 
|-id=155 bgcolor=#FFC2E0
| 138155 ||  || — || March 6, 2000 || Haleakala || NEAT || AMO +1km || align=right | 1.3 km || 
|-id=156 bgcolor=#E9E9E9
| 138156 ||  || — || March 10, 2000 || Kitt Peak || Spacewatch || — || align=right | 1.4 km || 
|-id=157 bgcolor=#fefefe
| 138157 ||  || — || March 5, 2000 || Socorro || LINEAR || V || align=right | 1.6 km || 
|-id=158 bgcolor=#E9E9E9
| 138158 ||  || — || March 5, 2000 || Socorro || LINEAR || — || align=right | 3.2 km || 
|-id=159 bgcolor=#fefefe
| 138159 ||  || — || March 8, 2000 || Socorro || LINEAR || — || align=right | 1.9 km || 
|-id=160 bgcolor=#E9E9E9
| 138160 ||  || — || March 8, 2000 || Socorro || LINEAR || EUN || align=right | 2.5 km || 
|-id=161 bgcolor=#E9E9E9
| 138161 ||  || — || March 9, 2000 || Socorro || LINEAR || GER || align=right | 2.9 km || 
|-id=162 bgcolor=#E9E9E9
| 138162 ||  || — || March 9, 2000 || Socorro || LINEAR || MAR || align=right | 2.6 km || 
|-id=163 bgcolor=#E9E9E9
| 138163 ||  || — || March 9, 2000 || Socorro || LINEAR || — || align=right | 2.9 km || 
|-id=164 bgcolor=#E9E9E9
| 138164 ||  || — || March 11, 2000 || Socorro || LINEAR || — || align=right | 3.1 km || 
|-id=165 bgcolor=#E9E9E9
| 138165 ||  || — || March 12, 2000 || Socorro || LINEAR || EUN || align=right | 2.8 km || 
|-id=166 bgcolor=#fefefe
| 138166 ||  || — || March 10, 2000 || Socorro || LINEAR || PHO || align=right | 2.5 km || 
|-id=167 bgcolor=#E9E9E9
| 138167 ||  || — || March 12, 2000 || Kitt Peak || Spacewatch || — || align=right | 2.6 km || 
|-id=168 bgcolor=#E9E9E9
| 138168 ||  || — || March 12, 2000 || Kitt Peak || Spacewatch || — || align=right | 3.0 km || 
|-id=169 bgcolor=#fefefe
| 138169 ||  || — || March 12, 2000 || Kitt Peak || Spacewatch || NYS || align=right | 1.0 km || 
|-id=170 bgcolor=#E9E9E9
| 138170 ||  || — || March 12, 2000 || Kitt Peak || Spacewatch || — || align=right | 1.3 km || 
|-id=171 bgcolor=#E9E9E9
| 138171 ||  || — || March 14, 2000 || Kitt Peak || Spacewatch || — || align=right | 2.7 km || 
|-id=172 bgcolor=#E9E9E9
| 138172 ||  || — || March 14, 2000 || Kitt Peak || Spacewatch || NEM || align=right | 4.6 km || 
|-id=173 bgcolor=#E9E9E9
| 138173 ||  || — || March 12, 2000 || Socorro || LINEAR || — || align=right | 2.8 km || 
|-id=174 bgcolor=#E9E9E9
| 138174 ||  || — || March 13, 2000 || Socorro || LINEAR || — || align=right | 1.8 km || 
|-id=175 bgcolor=#FFC2E0
| 138175 ||  || — || March 11, 2000 || Catalina || CSS || APOPHA || align=right data-sort-value="0.30" | 300 m || 
|-id=176 bgcolor=#E9E9E9
| 138176 ||  || — || March 11, 2000 || Anderson Mesa || LONEOS || — || align=right | 3.7 km || 
|-id=177 bgcolor=#E9E9E9
| 138177 ||  || — || March 11, 2000 || Anderson Mesa || LONEOS || MAR || align=right | 2.0 km || 
|-id=178 bgcolor=#E9E9E9
| 138178 ||  || — || March 11, 2000 || Anderson Mesa || LONEOS || MAR || align=right | 2.7 km || 
|-id=179 bgcolor=#E9E9E9
| 138179 ||  || — || March 8, 2000 || Socorro || LINEAR || — || align=right | 5.7 km || 
|-id=180 bgcolor=#fefefe
| 138180 ||  || — || March 8, 2000 || Haleakala || NEAT || — || align=right | 3.1 km || 
|-id=181 bgcolor=#E9E9E9
| 138181 ||  || — || March 8, 2000 || Haleakala || NEAT || — || align=right | 2.5 km || 
|-id=182 bgcolor=#E9E9E9
| 138182 ||  || — || March 8, 2000 || Haleakala || NEAT || — || align=right | 2.9 km || 
|-id=183 bgcolor=#E9E9E9
| 138183 ||  || — || March 9, 2000 || Socorro || LINEAR || — || align=right | 3.6 km || 
|-id=184 bgcolor=#fefefe
| 138184 ||  || — || March 9, 2000 || Socorro || LINEAR || ERI || align=right | 3.3 km || 
|-id=185 bgcolor=#E9E9E9
| 138185 ||  || — || March 9, 2000 || Kitt Peak || Spacewatch || — || align=right | 1.4 km || 
|-id=186 bgcolor=#E9E9E9
| 138186 ||  || — || March 10, 2000 || Kitt Peak || Spacewatch || MRX || align=right | 1.9 km || 
|-id=187 bgcolor=#E9E9E9
| 138187 ||  || — || March 10, 2000 || Kitt Peak || Spacewatch || — || align=right | 2.8 km || 
|-id=188 bgcolor=#E9E9E9
| 138188 ||  || — || March 10, 2000 || Kitt Peak || Spacewatch || HEN || align=right | 1.4 km || 
|-id=189 bgcolor=#E9E9E9
| 138189 ||  || — || March 10, 2000 || Kitt Peak || Spacewatch || — || align=right | 2.2 km || 
|-id=190 bgcolor=#E9E9E9
| 138190 ||  || — || March 11, 2000 || Anderson Mesa || LONEOS || MAR || align=right | 3.1 km || 
|-id=191 bgcolor=#E9E9E9
| 138191 ||  || — || March 11, 2000 || Anderson Mesa || LONEOS || HNS || align=right | 2.9 km || 
|-id=192 bgcolor=#fefefe
| 138192 ||  || — || March 11, 2000 || Anderson Mesa || LONEOS || V || align=right | 1.8 km || 
|-id=193 bgcolor=#E9E9E9
| 138193 ||  || — || March 11, 2000 || Anderson Mesa || LONEOS || — || align=right | 1.7 km || 
|-id=194 bgcolor=#E9E9E9
| 138194 ||  || — || March 11, 2000 || Anderson Mesa || LONEOS || — || align=right | 2.0 km || 
|-id=195 bgcolor=#fefefe
| 138195 ||  || — || March 11, 2000 || Anderson Mesa || LONEOS || H || align=right | 1.0 km || 
|-id=196 bgcolor=#E9E9E9
| 138196 ||  || — || March 11, 2000 || Anderson Mesa || LONEOS || — || align=right | 2.6 km || 
|-id=197 bgcolor=#fefefe
| 138197 ||  || — || March 11, 2000 || Socorro || LINEAR || H || align=right data-sort-value="0.80" | 800 m || 
|-id=198 bgcolor=#E9E9E9
| 138198 ||  || — || March 11, 2000 || Anderson Mesa || LONEOS || MAR || align=right | 2.5 km || 
|-id=199 bgcolor=#E9E9E9
| 138199 ||  || — || March 11, 2000 || Socorro || LINEAR || RAF || align=right | 1.5 km || 
|-id=200 bgcolor=#E9E9E9
| 138200 ||  || — || March 10, 2000 || Kvistaberg || UDAS || — || align=right | 2.2 km || 
|}

138201–138300 

|-bgcolor=#fefefe
| 138201 ||  || — || March 11, 2000 || Socorro || LINEAR || NYS || align=right | 1.2 km || 
|-id=202 bgcolor=#E9E9E9
| 138202 ||  || — || March 11, 2000 || Socorro || LINEAR || — || align=right | 2.2 km || 
|-id=203 bgcolor=#fefefe
| 138203 ||  || — || March 3, 2000 || Socorro || LINEAR || V || align=right | 1.1 km || 
|-id=204 bgcolor=#fefefe
| 138204 ||  || — || March 4, 2000 || Socorro || LINEAR || — || align=right | 2.0 km || 
|-id=205 bgcolor=#FFC2E0
| 138205 ||  || — || March 4, 2000 || Catalina || CSS || APO +1km || align=right | 3.5 km || 
|-id=206 bgcolor=#fefefe
| 138206 ||  || — || March 5, 2000 || Socorro || LINEAR || NYS || align=right data-sort-value="0.92" | 920 m || 
|-id=207 bgcolor=#fefefe
| 138207 ||  || — || March 5, 2000 || Socorro || LINEAR || NYS || align=right | 1.2 km || 
|-id=208 bgcolor=#E9E9E9
| 138208 ||  || — || March 3, 2000 || Socorro || LINEAR || — || align=right | 2.2 km || 
|-id=209 bgcolor=#d6d6d6
| 138209 ||  || — || March 3, 2000 || Socorro || LINEAR || THM || align=right | 3.8 km || 
|-id=210 bgcolor=#E9E9E9
| 138210 ||  || — || March 3, 2000 || Socorro || LINEAR || — || align=right | 1.8 km || 
|-id=211 bgcolor=#E9E9E9
| 138211 ||  || — || March 4, 2000 || Socorro || LINEAR || — || align=right | 3.4 km || 
|-id=212 bgcolor=#E9E9E9
| 138212 ||  || — || March 1, 2000 || Catalina || CSS || — || align=right | 2.2 km || 
|-id=213 bgcolor=#d6d6d6
| 138213 ||  || — || March 3, 2000 || Kitt Peak || Spacewatch || — || align=right | 3.5 km || 
|-id=214 bgcolor=#E9E9E9
| 138214 ||  || — || March 4, 2000 || Socorro || LINEAR || — || align=right | 3.3 km || 
|-id=215 bgcolor=#E9E9E9
| 138215 ||  || — || March 4, 2000 || Socorro || LINEAR || — || align=right | 2.7 km || 
|-id=216 bgcolor=#E9E9E9
| 138216 ||  || — || March 5, 2000 || Socorro || LINEAR || MAR || align=right | 3.0 km || 
|-id=217 bgcolor=#E9E9E9
| 138217 ||  || — || March 3, 2000 || Socorro || LINEAR || — || align=right | 3.1 km || 
|-id=218 bgcolor=#E9E9E9
| 138218 ||  || — || March 3, 2000 || Socorro || LINEAR || — || align=right | 2.6 km || 
|-id=219 bgcolor=#E9E9E9
| 138219 ||  || — || March 3, 2000 || Socorro || LINEAR || — || align=right | 1.3 km || 
|-id=220 bgcolor=#E9E9E9
| 138220 ||  || — || March 3, 2000 || Socorro || LINEAR || — || align=right | 2.4 km || 
|-id=221 bgcolor=#E9E9E9
| 138221 Baldry ||  ||  || March 3, 2000 || Apache Point || SDSS || — || align=right | 1.8 km || 
|-id=222 bgcolor=#fefefe
| 138222 ||  || — || March 28, 2000 || Socorro || LINEAR || — || align=right | 3.3 km || 
|-id=223 bgcolor=#E9E9E9
| 138223 ||  || — || March 25, 2000 || Kitt Peak || Spacewatch || — || align=right | 1.4 km || 
|-id=224 bgcolor=#E9E9E9
| 138224 ||  || — || March 29, 2000 || Kitt Peak || Spacewatch || — || align=right | 1.7 km || 
|-id=225 bgcolor=#E9E9E9
| 138225 ||  || — || March 29, 2000 || Kitt Peak || Spacewatch || RAF || align=right | 1.3 km || 
|-id=226 bgcolor=#E9E9E9
| 138226 ||  || — || March 28, 2000 || Socorro || LINEAR || EUN || align=right | 3.7 km || 
|-id=227 bgcolor=#E9E9E9
| 138227 ||  || — || March 28, 2000 || Socorro || LINEAR || — || align=right | 2.2 km || 
|-id=228 bgcolor=#fefefe
| 138228 ||  || — || March 28, 2000 || Socorro || LINEAR || — || align=right | 3.4 km || 
|-id=229 bgcolor=#fefefe
| 138229 ||  || — || March 29, 2000 || Socorro || LINEAR || — || align=right | 2.2 km || 
|-id=230 bgcolor=#E9E9E9
| 138230 ||  || — || March 29, 2000 || Socorro || LINEAR || — || align=right | 3.5 km || 
|-id=231 bgcolor=#E9E9E9
| 138231 ||  || — || March 29, 2000 || Socorro || LINEAR || — || align=right | 4.4 km || 
|-id=232 bgcolor=#E9E9E9
| 138232 ||  || — || March 30, 2000 || Socorro || LINEAR || — || align=right | 2.7 km || 
|-id=233 bgcolor=#E9E9E9
| 138233 ||  || — || March 29, 2000 || Socorro || LINEAR || ADE || align=right | 4.8 km || 
|-id=234 bgcolor=#E9E9E9
| 138234 ||  || — || March 29, 2000 || Socorro || LINEAR || — || align=right | 2.7 km || 
|-id=235 bgcolor=#E9E9E9
| 138235 ||  || — || March 29, 2000 || Socorro || LINEAR || — || align=right | 4.1 km || 
|-id=236 bgcolor=#E9E9E9
| 138236 ||  || — || March 29, 2000 || Socorro || LINEAR || — || align=right | 2.2 km || 
|-id=237 bgcolor=#E9E9E9
| 138237 ||  || — || March 27, 2000 || Anderson Mesa || LONEOS || EUN || align=right | 2.3 km || 
|-id=238 bgcolor=#E9E9E9
| 138238 ||  || — || March 27, 2000 || Anderson Mesa || LONEOS || — || align=right | 3.4 km || 
|-id=239 bgcolor=#fefefe
| 138239 ||  || — || March 29, 2000 || Socorro || LINEAR || NYS || align=right | 1.4 km || 
|-id=240 bgcolor=#fefefe
| 138240 ||  || — || March 29, 2000 || Socorro || LINEAR || — || align=right | 4.1 km || 
|-id=241 bgcolor=#E9E9E9
| 138241 ||  || — || March 29, 2000 || Socorro || LINEAR || — || align=right | 4.3 km || 
|-id=242 bgcolor=#E9E9E9
| 138242 ||  || — || March 29, 2000 || Socorro || LINEAR || HEN || align=right | 2.2 km || 
|-id=243 bgcolor=#E9E9E9
| 138243 ||  || — || March 29, 2000 || Socorro || LINEAR || — || align=right | 2.9 km || 
|-id=244 bgcolor=#E9E9E9
| 138244 ||  || — || March 29, 2000 || Socorro || LINEAR || — || align=right | 1.7 km || 
|-id=245 bgcolor=#E9E9E9
| 138245 ||  || — || March 29, 2000 || Socorro || LINEAR || — || align=right | 5.4 km || 
|-id=246 bgcolor=#E9E9E9
| 138246 ||  || — || March 29, 2000 || Socorro || LINEAR || — || align=right | 4.7 km || 
|-id=247 bgcolor=#E9E9E9
| 138247 ||  || — || March 29, 2000 || Kitt Peak || Spacewatch || — || align=right | 2.2 km || 
|-id=248 bgcolor=#E9E9E9
| 138248 ||  || — || March 30, 2000 || Kitt Peak || Spacewatch || — || align=right | 3.1 km || 
|-id=249 bgcolor=#E9E9E9
| 138249 ||  || — || March 29, 2000 || Socorro || LINEAR || — || align=right | 3.2 km || 
|-id=250 bgcolor=#E9E9E9
| 138250 ||  || — || March 29, 2000 || Socorro || LINEAR || — || align=right | 1.6 km || 
|-id=251 bgcolor=#E9E9E9
| 138251 ||  || — || March 26, 2000 || Anderson Mesa || LONEOS || — || align=right | 2.6 km || 
|-id=252 bgcolor=#E9E9E9
| 138252 ||  || — || March 27, 2000 || Anderson Mesa || LONEOS || — || align=right | 2.9 km || 
|-id=253 bgcolor=#fefefe
| 138253 ||  || — || March 29, 2000 || Socorro || LINEAR || NYS || align=right | 1.1 km || 
|-id=254 bgcolor=#E9E9E9
| 138254 ||  || — || March 29, 2000 || Socorro || LINEAR || MAR || align=right | 3.1 km || 
|-id=255 bgcolor=#E9E9E9
| 138255 ||  || — || March 27, 2000 || Anderson Mesa || LONEOS || — || align=right | 1.5 km || 
|-id=256 bgcolor=#E9E9E9
| 138256 ||  || — || March 27, 2000 || Kitt Peak || Spacewatch || — || align=right | 2.5 km || 
|-id=257 bgcolor=#E9E9E9
| 138257 ||  || — || March 29, 2000 || Kitt Peak || Spacewatch || — || align=right | 1.3 km || 
|-id=258 bgcolor=#FFC2E0
| 138258 ||  || — || April 3, 2000 || Socorro || LINEAR || ATEcritical || align=right data-sort-value="0.54" | 540 m || 
|-id=259 bgcolor=#fefefe
| 138259 ||  || — || April 5, 2000 || Socorro || LINEAR || H || align=right data-sort-value="0.83" | 830 m || 
|-id=260 bgcolor=#FA8072
| 138260 ||  || — || April 5, 2000 || Socorro || LINEAR || H || align=right | 1.3 km || 
|-id=261 bgcolor=#E9E9E9
| 138261 ||  || — || April 5, 2000 || Socorro || LINEAR || — || align=right | 3.6 km || 
|-id=262 bgcolor=#E9E9E9
| 138262 ||  || — || April 5, 2000 || Socorro || LINEAR || — || align=right | 3.3 km || 
|-id=263 bgcolor=#E9E9E9
| 138263 ||  || — || April 5, 2000 || Socorro || LINEAR || — || align=right | 2.0 km || 
|-id=264 bgcolor=#E9E9E9
| 138264 ||  || — || April 5, 2000 || Socorro || LINEAR || — || align=right | 1.6 km || 
|-id=265 bgcolor=#E9E9E9
| 138265 ||  || — || April 5, 2000 || Socorro || LINEAR || — || align=right | 2.4 km || 
|-id=266 bgcolor=#E9E9E9
| 138266 ||  || — || April 5, 2000 || Socorro || LINEAR || — || align=right | 2.9 km || 
|-id=267 bgcolor=#E9E9E9
| 138267 ||  || — || April 5, 2000 || Socorro || LINEAR || MAR || align=right | 1.9 km || 
|-id=268 bgcolor=#fefefe
| 138268 ||  || — || April 5, 2000 || Socorro || LINEAR || — || align=right | 2.0 km || 
|-id=269 bgcolor=#E9E9E9
| 138269 ||  || — || April 5, 2000 || Socorro || LINEAR || — || align=right | 1.8 km || 
|-id=270 bgcolor=#E9E9E9
| 138270 ||  || — || April 5, 2000 || Socorro || LINEAR || MAR || align=right | 2.5 km || 
|-id=271 bgcolor=#E9E9E9
| 138271 ||  || — || April 5, 2000 || Socorro || LINEAR || HEN || align=right | 1.8 km || 
|-id=272 bgcolor=#E9E9E9
| 138272 ||  || — || April 5, 2000 || Socorro || LINEAR || — || align=right | 1.4 km || 
|-id=273 bgcolor=#fefefe
| 138273 ||  || — || April 5, 2000 || Socorro || LINEAR || NYS || align=right | 1.2 km || 
|-id=274 bgcolor=#E9E9E9
| 138274 ||  || — || April 5, 2000 || Socorro || LINEAR || — || align=right | 1.5 km || 
|-id=275 bgcolor=#E9E9E9
| 138275 ||  || — || April 5, 2000 || Socorro || LINEAR || — || align=right | 3.7 km || 
|-id=276 bgcolor=#fefefe
| 138276 ||  || — || April 8, 2000 || Socorro || LINEAR || H || align=right data-sort-value="0.94" | 940 m || 
|-id=277 bgcolor=#E9E9E9
| 138277 ||  || — || April 5, 2000 || Socorro || LINEAR || HEN || align=right | 2.1 km || 
|-id=278 bgcolor=#E9E9E9
| 138278 ||  || — || April 5, 2000 || Socorro || LINEAR || — || align=right | 3.2 km || 
|-id=279 bgcolor=#E9E9E9
| 138279 ||  || — || April 5, 2000 || Socorro || LINEAR || — || align=right | 2.2 km || 
|-id=280 bgcolor=#E9E9E9
| 138280 ||  || — || April 5, 2000 || Socorro || LINEAR || — || align=right | 3.7 km || 
|-id=281 bgcolor=#E9E9E9
| 138281 ||  || — || April 5, 2000 || Socorro || LINEAR || — || align=right | 1.7 km || 
|-id=282 bgcolor=#E9E9E9
| 138282 ||  || — || April 5, 2000 || Socorro || LINEAR || — || align=right | 5.5 km || 
|-id=283 bgcolor=#E9E9E9
| 138283 ||  || — || April 5, 2000 || Socorro || LINEAR || HEN || align=right | 1.7 km || 
|-id=284 bgcolor=#E9E9E9
| 138284 ||  || — || April 5, 2000 || Socorro || LINEAR || — || align=right | 2.7 km || 
|-id=285 bgcolor=#E9E9E9
| 138285 ||  || — || April 5, 2000 || Socorro || LINEAR || — || align=right | 2.8 km || 
|-id=286 bgcolor=#fefefe
| 138286 ||  || — || April 5, 2000 || Socorro || LINEAR || — || align=right | 2.8 km || 
|-id=287 bgcolor=#E9E9E9
| 138287 ||  || — || April 5, 2000 || Socorro || LINEAR || — || align=right | 3.2 km || 
|-id=288 bgcolor=#E9E9E9
| 138288 ||  || — || April 5, 2000 || Socorro || LINEAR || — || align=right | 1.4 km || 
|-id=289 bgcolor=#E9E9E9
| 138289 ||  || — || April 5, 2000 || Socorro || LINEAR || HEN || align=right | 1.6 km || 
|-id=290 bgcolor=#E9E9E9
| 138290 ||  || — || April 5, 2000 || Socorro || LINEAR || — || align=right | 1.6 km || 
|-id=291 bgcolor=#E9E9E9
| 138291 ||  || — || April 5, 2000 || Socorro || LINEAR || — || align=right | 1.7 km || 
|-id=292 bgcolor=#E9E9E9
| 138292 ||  || — || April 5, 2000 || Socorro || LINEAR || — || align=right | 1.6 km || 
|-id=293 bgcolor=#E9E9E9
| 138293 ||  || — || April 5, 2000 || Socorro || LINEAR || HOF || align=right | 4.8 km || 
|-id=294 bgcolor=#E9E9E9
| 138294 ||  || — || April 5, 2000 || Socorro || LINEAR || — || align=right | 2.7 km || 
|-id=295 bgcolor=#d6d6d6
| 138295 ||  || — || April 5, 2000 || Socorro || LINEAR || — || align=right | 6.9 km || 
|-id=296 bgcolor=#fefefe
| 138296 ||  || — || April 5, 2000 || Socorro || LINEAR || — || align=right | 1.4 km || 
|-id=297 bgcolor=#E9E9E9
| 138297 ||  || — || April 5, 2000 || Socorro || LINEAR || GEF || align=right | 2.1 km || 
|-id=298 bgcolor=#E9E9E9
| 138298 ||  || — || April 5, 2000 || Socorro || LINEAR || — || align=right | 1.5 km || 
|-id=299 bgcolor=#E9E9E9
| 138299 ||  || — || April 5, 2000 || Socorro || LINEAR || ADE || align=right | 4.6 km || 
|-id=300 bgcolor=#d6d6d6
| 138300 ||  || — || April 5, 2000 || Socorro || LINEAR || — || align=right | 2.7 km || 
|}

138301–138400 

|-bgcolor=#d6d6d6
| 138301 ||  || — || April 5, 2000 || Socorro || LINEAR || — || align=right | 4.0 km || 
|-id=302 bgcolor=#E9E9E9
| 138302 ||  || — || April 5, 2000 || Socorro || LINEAR || — || align=right | 1.6 km || 
|-id=303 bgcolor=#E9E9E9
| 138303 ||  || — || April 5, 2000 || Socorro || LINEAR || — || align=right | 1.4 km || 
|-id=304 bgcolor=#E9E9E9
| 138304 ||  || — || April 5, 2000 || Socorro || LINEAR || — || align=right | 3.1 km || 
|-id=305 bgcolor=#E9E9E9
| 138305 ||  || — || April 5, 2000 || Socorro || LINEAR || MRX || align=right | 2.1 km || 
|-id=306 bgcolor=#d6d6d6
| 138306 ||  || — || April 5, 2000 || Socorro || LINEAR || — || align=right | 2.4 km || 
|-id=307 bgcolor=#E9E9E9
| 138307 ||  || — || April 5, 2000 || Socorro || LINEAR || — || align=right | 2.1 km || 
|-id=308 bgcolor=#E9E9E9
| 138308 ||  || — || April 5, 2000 || Socorro || LINEAR || CLO || align=right | 3.6 km || 
|-id=309 bgcolor=#fefefe
| 138309 ||  || — || April 5, 2000 || Socorro || LINEAR || NYS || align=right | 1.4 km || 
|-id=310 bgcolor=#E9E9E9
| 138310 ||  || — || April 5, 2000 || Socorro || LINEAR || — || align=right | 2.7 km || 
|-id=311 bgcolor=#d6d6d6
| 138311 ||  || — || April 5, 2000 || Socorro || LINEAR || — || align=right | 4.6 km || 
|-id=312 bgcolor=#E9E9E9
| 138312 ||  || — || April 5, 2000 || Socorro || LINEAR || MRX || align=right | 1.8 km || 
|-id=313 bgcolor=#E9E9E9
| 138313 ||  || — || April 5, 2000 || Socorro || LINEAR || — || align=right | 2.9 km || 
|-id=314 bgcolor=#E9E9E9
| 138314 ||  || — || April 5, 2000 || Socorro || LINEAR || — || align=right | 4.7 km || 
|-id=315 bgcolor=#E9E9E9
| 138315 ||  || — || April 5, 2000 || Socorro || LINEAR || — || align=right | 3.2 km || 
|-id=316 bgcolor=#E9E9E9
| 138316 ||  || — || April 5, 2000 || Socorro || LINEAR || — || align=right | 1.7 km || 
|-id=317 bgcolor=#E9E9E9
| 138317 ||  || — || April 5, 2000 || Socorro || LINEAR || — || align=right | 5.3 km || 
|-id=318 bgcolor=#E9E9E9
| 138318 ||  || — || April 5, 2000 || Socorro || LINEAR || — || align=right | 2.7 km || 
|-id=319 bgcolor=#E9E9E9
| 138319 ||  || — || April 5, 2000 || Socorro || LINEAR || — || align=right | 1.4 km || 
|-id=320 bgcolor=#E9E9E9
| 138320 ||  || — || April 5, 2000 || Socorro || LINEAR || — || align=right | 2.7 km || 
|-id=321 bgcolor=#fefefe
| 138321 ||  || — || April 6, 2000 || Socorro || LINEAR || NYS || align=right | 1.2 km || 
|-id=322 bgcolor=#E9E9E9
| 138322 ||  || — || April 6, 2000 || Socorro || LINEAR || — || align=right | 2.1 km || 
|-id=323 bgcolor=#fefefe
| 138323 ||  || — || April 6, 2000 || Socorro || LINEAR || H || align=right | 1.3 km || 
|-id=324 bgcolor=#fefefe
| 138324 ||  || — || April 7, 2000 || Socorro || LINEAR || H || align=right | 1.3 km || 
|-id=325 bgcolor=#FFC2E0
| 138325 ||  || — || April 3, 2000 || Socorro || LINEAR || APO +1km || align=right | 1.6 km || 
|-id=326 bgcolor=#E9E9E9
| 138326 ||  || — || April 4, 2000 || Socorro || LINEAR || — || align=right | 1.4 km || 
|-id=327 bgcolor=#E9E9E9
| 138327 ||  || — || April 4, 2000 || Socorro || LINEAR || — || align=right | 4.2 km || 
|-id=328 bgcolor=#E9E9E9
| 138328 ||  || — || April 4, 2000 || Socorro || LINEAR || — || align=right | 2.7 km || 
|-id=329 bgcolor=#E9E9E9
| 138329 ||  || — || April 4, 2000 || Socorro || LINEAR || HNS || align=right | 3.5 km || 
|-id=330 bgcolor=#E9E9E9
| 138330 ||  || — || April 4, 2000 || Socorro || LINEAR || — || align=right | 5.0 km || 
|-id=331 bgcolor=#E9E9E9
| 138331 ||  || — || April 5, 2000 || Socorro || LINEAR || — || align=right | 5.4 km || 
|-id=332 bgcolor=#E9E9E9
| 138332 ||  || — || April 5, 2000 || Socorro || LINEAR || — || align=right | 3.4 km || 
|-id=333 bgcolor=#E9E9E9
| 138333 ||  || — || April 7, 2000 || Socorro || LINEAR || MIS || align=right | 3.7 km || 
|-id=334 bgcolor=#E9E9E9
| 138334 ||  || — || April 7, 2000 || Socorro || LINEAR || — || align=right | 1.9 km || 
|-id=335 bgcolor=#E9E9E9
| 138335 ||  || — || April 7, 2000 || Socorro || LINEAR || — || align=right | 2.6 km || 
|-id=336 bgcolor=#E9E9E9
| 138336 ||  || — || April 7, 2000 || Socorro || LINEAR || — || align=right | 4.1 km || 
|-id=337 bgcolor=#E9E9E9
| 138337 ||  || — || April 7, 2000 || Socorro || LINEAR || — || align=right | 2.0 km || 
|-id=338 bgcolor=#E9E9E9
| 138338 ||  || — || April 7, 2000 || Socorro || LINEAR || — || align=right | 1.8 km || 
|-id=339 bgcolor=#E9E9E9
| 138339 ||  || — || April 7, 2000 || Socorro || LINEAR || — || align=right | 2.0 km || 
|-id=340 bgcolor=#fefefe
| 138340 ||  || — || April 2, 2000 || Anderson Mesa || LONEOS || MAS || align=right | 1.4 km || 
|-id=341 bgcolor=#fefefe
| 138341 ||  || — || April 2, 2000 || Anderson Mesa || LONEOS || — || align=right | 1.7 km || 
|-id=342 bgcolor=#E9E9E9
| 138342 ||  || — || April 2, 2000 || Anderson Mesa || LONEOS || — || align=right | 1.9 km || 
|-id=343 bgcolor=#E9E9E9
| 138343 ||  || — || April 3, 2000 || Anderson Mesa || LONEOS || INO || align=right | 2.0 km || 
|-id=344 bgcolor=#E9E9E9
| 138344 ||  || — || April 4, 2000 || Socorro || LINEAR || MAR || align=right | 3.3 km || 
|-id=345 bgcolor=#E9E9E9
| 138345 ||  || — || April 5, 2000 || Socorro || LINEAR || MAR || align=right | 1.8 km || 
|-id=346 bgcolor=#E9E9E9
| 138346 ||  || — || April 6, 2000 || Socorro || LINEAR || MIT || align=right | 3.9 km || 
|-id=347 bgcolor=#E9E9E9
| 138347 ||  || — || April 7, 2000 || Socorro || LINEAR || — || align=right | 2.2 km || 
|-id=348 bgcolor=#E9E9E9
| 138348 ||  || — || April 7, 2000 || Socorro || LINEAR || — || align=right | 2.1 km || 
|-id=349 bgcolor=#E9E9E9
| 138349 ||  || — || April 8, 2000 || Socorro || LINEAR || — || align=right | 3.3 km || 
|-id=350 bgcolor=#E9E9E9
| 138350 ||  || — || April 8, 2000 || Socorro || LINEAR || ADE || align=right | 4.7 km || 
|-id=351 bgcolor=#E9E9E9
| 138351 ||  || — || April 8, 2000 || Socorro || LINEAR || — || align=right | 2.0 km || 
|-id=352 bgcolor=#E9E9E9
| 138352 ||  || — || April 2, 2000 || Kitt Peak || Spacewatch || — || align=right | 3.3 km || 
|-id=353 bgcolor=#fefefe
| 138353 ||  || — || April 2, 2000 || Kitt Peak || Spacewatch || — || align=right | 1.9 km || 
|-id=354 bgcolor=#E9E9E9
| 138354 ||  || — || April 2, 2000 || Kitt Peak || Spacewatch || MAR || align=right | 1.6 km || 
|-id=355 bgcolor=#E9E9E9
| 138355 ||  || — || April 2, 2000 || Kitt Peak || Spacewatch || — || align=right | 3.5 km || 
|-id=356 bgcolor=#E9E9E9
| 138356 ||  || — || April 6, 2000 || Kitt Peak || Spacewatch || — || align=right | 4.3 km || 
|-id=357 bgcolor=#fefefe
| 138357 ||  || — || April 8, 2000 || Socorro || LINEAR || H || align=right | 1.1 km || 
|-id=358 bgcolor=#E9E9E9
| 138358 ||  || — || April 8, 2000 || Socorro || LINEAR || EUN || align=right | 2.3 km || 
|-id=359 bgcolor=#FFC2E0
| 138359 ||  || — || April 10, 2000 || Kitt Peak || Spacewatch || APO +1km || align=right | 1.1 km || 
|-id=360 bgcolor=#E9E9E9
| 138360 ||  || — || April 5, 2000 || Kitt Peak || Spacewatch || — || align=right | 1.4 km || 
|-id=361 bgcolor=#E9E9E9
| 138361 ||  || — || April 8, 2000 || Kitt Peak || Spacewatch || — || align=right | 1.6 km || 
|-id=362 bgcolor=#fefefe
| 138362 ||  || — || April 12, 2000 || Haleakala || NEAT || H || align=right | 1.5 km || 
|-id=363 bgcolor=#E9E9E9
| 138363 ||  || — || April 8, 2000 || Socorro || LINEAR || — || align=right | 3.3 km || 
|-id=364 bgcolor=#E9E9E9
| 138364 ||  || — || April 4, 2000 || Anderson Mesa || LONEOS || — || align=right | 3.1 km || 
|-id=365 bgcolor=#E9E9E9
| 138365 ||  || — || April 4, 2000 || Anderson Mesa || LONEOS || — || align=right | 3.4 km || 
|-id=366 bgcolor=#E9E9E9
| 138366 ||  || — || April 4, 2000 || Anderson Mesa || LONEOS || — || align=right | 4.5 km || 
|-id=367 bgcolor=#E9E9E9
| 138367 ||  || — || April 4, 2000 || Anderson Mesa || LONEOS || — || align=right | 1.8 km || 
|-id=368 bgcolor=#E9E9E9
| 138368 ||  || — || April 4, 2000 || Anderson Mesa || LONEOS || — || align=right | 1.7 km || 
|-id=369 bgcolor=#fefefe
| 138369 ||  || — || April 4, 2000 || Anderson Mesa || LONEOS || NYS || align=right | 1.3 km || 
|-id=370 bgcolor=#E9E9E9
| 138370 ||  || — || April 7, 2000 || Anderson Mesa || LONEOS || — || align=right | 3.2 km || 
|-id=371 bgcolor=#d6d6d6
| 138371 ||  || — || April 7, 2000 || Kitt Peak || Spacewatch || — || align=right | 3.7 km || 
|-id=372 bgcolor=#E9E9E9
| 138372 ||  || — || April 7, 2000 || Kitt Peak || Spacewatch || — || align=right | 3.8 km || 
|-id=373 bgcolor=#E9E9E9
| 138373 ||  || — || April 5, 2000 || Socorro || LINEAR || — || align=right | 2.4 km || 
|-id=374 bgcolor=#E9E9E9
| 138374 ||  || — || April 5, 2000 || Socorro || LINEAR || — || align=right | 2.2 km || 
|-id=375 bgcolor=#E9E9E9
| 138375 ||  || — || April 5, 2000 || Kitt Peak || Spacewatch || — || align=right | 1.6 km || 
|-id=376 bgcolor=#E9E9E9
| 138376 ||  || — || April 6, 2000 || Anderson Mesa || LONEOS || — || align=right | 2.1 km || 
|-id=377 bgcolor=#fefefe
| 138377 ||  || — || April 6, 2000 || Anderson Mesa || LONEOS || PHO || align=right | 2.1 km || 
|-id=378 bgcolor=#E9E9E9
| 138378 ||  || — || April 6, 2000 || Anderson Mesa || LONEOS || — || align=right | 2.0 km || 
|-id=379 bgcolor=#E9E9E9
| 138379 ||  || — || April 6, 2000 || Socorro || LINEAR || WIT || align=right | 1.7 km || 
|-id=380 bgcolor=#E9E9E9
| 138380 ||  || — || April 7, 2000 || Socorro || LINEAR || — || align=right | 4.0 km || 
|-id=381 bgcolor=#E9E9E9
| 138381 ||  || — || April 8, 2000 || Socorro || LINEAR || — || align=right | 2.5 km || 
|-id=382 bgcolor=#E9E9E9
| 138382 ||  || — || April 8, 2000 || Socorro || LINEAR || — || align=right | 2.6 km || 
|-id=383 bgcolor=#E9E9E9
| 138383 ||  || — || April 9, 2000 || Anderson Mesa || LONEOS || PAE || align=right | 3.9 km || 
|-id=384 bgcolor=#E9E9E9
| 138384 ||  || — || April 5, 2000 || Socorro || LINEAR || — || align=right | 1.4 km || 
|-id=385 bgcolor=#fefefe
| 138385 ||  || — || April 4, 2000 || Socorro || LINEAR || H || align=right | 1.1 km || 
|-id=386 bgcolor=#E9E9E9
| 138386 ||  || — || April 4, 2000 || Socorro || LINEAR || — || align=right | 2.6 km || 
|-id=387 bgcolor=#E9E9E9
| 138387 ||  || — || April 2, 2000 || Anderson Mesa || LONEOS || EUN || align=right | 3.5 km || 
|-id=388 bgcolor=#d6d6d6
| 138388 ||  || — || April 5, 2000 || Anderson Mesa || LONEOS || HIL3:2 || align=right | 10 km || 
|-id=389 bgcolor=#E9E9E9
| 138389 ||  || — || April 2, 2000 || Kitt Peak || Spacewatch || — || align=right | 2.7 km || 
|-id=390 bgcolor=#E9E9E9
| 138390 ||  || — || April 3, 2000 || Kitt Peak || Spacewatch || — || align=right | 2.5 km || 
|-id=391 bgcolor=#E9E9E9
| 138391 ||  || — || April 3, 2000 || Kitt Peak || Spacewatch || — || align=right | 2.3 km || 
|-id=392 bgcolor=#E9E9E9
| 138392 || 2000 HY || — || April 24, 2000 || Kitt Peak || Spacewatch || — || align=right | 4.7 km || 
|-id=393 bgcolor=#E9E9E9
| 138393 ||  || — || April 26, 2000 || Kitt Peak || Spacewatch || RAF || align=right | 3.6 km || 
|-id=394 bgcolor=#E9E9E9
| 138394 ||  || — || April 26, 2000 || Kitt Peak || Spacewatch || HEN || align=right | 1.9 km || 
|-id=395 bgcolor=#E9E9E9
| 138395 ||  || — || April 27, 2000 || Socorro || LINEAR || — || align=right | 4.2 km || 
|-id=396 bgcolor=#E9E9E9
| 138396 ||  || — || April 27, 2000 || Socorro || LINEAR || GEF || align=right | 2.5 km || 
|-id=397 bgcolor=#E9E9E9
| 138397 ||  || — || April 27, 2000 || Socorro || LINEAR || — || align=right | 4.5 km || 
|-id=398 bgcolor=#E9E9E9
| 138398 ||  || — || April 27, 2000 || Socorro || LINEAR || — || align=right | 3.6 km || 
|-id=399 bgcolor=#E9E9E9
| 138399 ||  || — || April 28, 2000 || Socorro || LINEAR || — || align=right | 2.7 km || 
|-id=400 bgcolor=#E9E9E9
| 138400 ||  || — || April 28, 2000 || Socorro || LINEAR || — || align=right | 3.2 km || 
|}

138401–138500 

|-bgcolor=#E9E9E9
| 138401 ||  || — || April 28, 2000 || Socorro || LINEAR || — || align=right | 3.4 km || 
|-id=402 bgcolor=#FA8072
| 138402 ||  || — || April 27, 2000 || Socorro || LINEAR || — || align=right | 1.5 km || 
|-id=403 bgcolor=#E9E9E9
| 138403 ||  || — || April 27, 2000 || Socorro || LINEAR || RAF || align=right | 2.0 km || 
|-id=404 bgcolor=#FFC2E0
| 138404 ||  || — || April 28, 2000 || Socorro || LINEAR || APOPHA || align=right data-sort-value="0.52" | 520 m || 
|-id=405 bgcolor=#E9E9E9
| 138405 ||  || — || April 24, 2000 || Anderson Mesa || LONEOS || GER || align=right | 4.4 km || 
|-id=406 bgcolor=#E9E9E9
| 138406 ||  || — || April 28, 2000 || Socorro || LINEAR || PAL || align=right | 4.2 km || 
|-id=407 bgcolor=#fefefe
| 138407 ||  || — || April 28, 2000 || Socorro || LINEAR || H || align=right | 1.1 km || 
|-id=408 bgcolor=#fefefe
| 138408 ||  || — || April 30, 2000 || Socorro || LINEAR || PHO || align=right | 2.3 km || 
|-id=409 bgcolor=#E9E9E9
| 138409 ||  || — || April 28, 2000 || Socorro || LINEAR || — || align=right | 2.4 km || 
|-id=410 bgcolor=#E9E9E9
| 138410 ||  || — || April 29, 2000 || Socorro || LINEAR || HNS || align=right | 2.3 km || 
|-id=411 bgcolor=#fefefe
| 138411 ||  || — || April 25, 2000 || Anderson Mesa || LONEOS || H || align=right | 1.0 km || 
|-id=412 bgcolor=#E9E9E9
| 138412 ||  || — || April 25, 2000 || Anderson Mesa || LONEOS || EUN || align=right | 2.6 km || 
|-id=413 bgcolor=#E9E9E9
| 138413 ||  || — || April 30, 2000 || Kitt Peak || Spacewatch || MIT || align=right | 4.3 km || 
|-id=414 bgcolor=#E9E9E9
| 138414 ||  || — || April 29, 2000 || Socorro || LINEAR || — || align=right | 1.9 km || 
|-id=415 bgcolor=#E9E9E9
| 138415 ||  || — || April 26, 2000 || Anderson Mesa || LONEOS || — || align=right | 4.1 km || 
|-id=416 bgcolor=#E9E9E9
| 138416 ||  || — || April 26, 2000 || Anderson Mesa || LONEOS || MIS || align=right | 4.0 km || 
|-id=417 bgcolor=#E9E9E9
| 138417 ||  || — || April 29, 2000 || Socorro || LINEAR || MIS || align=right | 4.2 km || 
|-id=418 bgcolor=#E9E9E9
| 138418 ||  || — || April 29, 2000 || Socorro || LINEAR || BRG || align=right | 3.8 km || 
|-id=419 bgcolor=#d6d6d6
| 138419 ||  || — || April 24, 2000 || Anderson Mesa || LONEOS || IMH || align=right | 5.2 km || 
|-id=420 bgcolor=#E9E9E9
| 138420 ||  || — || April 24, 2000 || Anderson Mesa || LONEOS || — || align=right | 2.5 km || 
|-id=421 bgcolor=#fefefe
| 138421 ||  || — || April 25, 2000 || Anderson Mesa || LONEOS || — || align=right | 1.6 km || 
|-id=422 bgcolor=#E9E9E9
| 138422 ||  || — || April 25, 2000 || Anderson Mesa || LONEOS || — || align=right | 2.6 km || 
|-id=423 bgcolor=#E9E9E9
| 138423 ||  || — || April 26, 2000 || Anderson Mesa || LONEOS || — || align=right | 1.6 km || 
|-id=424 bgcolor=#E9E9E9
| 138424 ||  || — || April 26, 2000 || Kitt Peak || Spacewatch || — || align=right | 2.4 km || 
|-id=425 bgcolor=#E9E9E9
| 138425 ||  || — || April 29, 2000 || Socorro || LINEAR || — || align=right | 2.7 km || 
|-id=426 bgcolor=#E9E9E9
| 138426 ||  || — || April 26, 2000 || Anderson Mesa || LONEOS || — || align=right | 4.6 km || 
|-id=427 bgcolor=#E9E9E9
| 138427 ||  || — || April 27, 2000 || Socorro || LINEAR || — || align=right | 6.3 km || 
|-id=428 bgcolor=#E9E9E9
| 138428 ||  || — || April 28, 2000 || Anderson Mesa || LONEOS || — || align=right | 2.7 km || 
|-id=429 bgcolor=#E9E9E9
| 138429 ||  || — || April 28, 2000 || Anderson Mesa || LONEOS || EUN || align=right | 2.6 km || 
|-id=430 bgcolor=#E9E9E9
| 138430 ||  || — || April 28, 2000 || Anderson Mesa || LONEOS || — || align=right | 4.2 km || 
|-id=431 bgcolor=#E9E9E9
| 138431 ||  || — || April 29, 2000 || Socorro || LINEAR || GEF || align=right | 2.7 km || 
|-id=432 bgcolor=#E9E9E9
| 138432 ||  || — || April 29, 2000 || Socorro || LINEAR || — || align=right | 3.5 km || 
|-id=433 bgcolor=#E9E9E9
| 138433 ||  || — || April 29, 2000 || Socorro || LINEAR || — || align=right | 2.5 km || 
|-id=434 bgcolor=#E9E9E9
| 138434 ||  || — || April 29, 2000 || Socorro || LINEAR || — || align=right | 1.8 km || 
|-id=435 bgcolor=#E9E9E9
| 138435 ||  || — || April 27, 2000 || Socorro || LINEAR || GEF || align=right | 2.7 km || 
|-id=436 bgcolor=#E9E9E9
| 138436 ||  || — || April 29, 2000 || Socorro || LINEAR || — || align=right | 1.7 km || 
|-id=437 bgcolor=#E9E9E9
| 138437 ||  || — || April 29, 2000 || Socorro || LINEAR || TIN || align=right | 4.2 km || 
|-id=438 bgcolor=#E9E9E9
| 138438 ||  || — || April 28, 2000 || Socorro || LINEAR || — || align=right | 2.0 km || 
|-id=439 bgcolor=#E9E9E9
| 138439 ||  || — || April 26, 2000 || Ondřejov || Ondřejov Obs. || — || align=right | 2.7 km || 
|-id=440 bgcolor=#E9E9E9
| 138440 ||  || — || April 26, 2000 || Anderson Mesa || LONEOS || — || align=right | 2.2 km || 
|-id=441 bgcolor=#E9E9E9
| 138441 ||  || — || April 27, 2000 || Socorro || LINEAR || — || align=right | 3.8 km || 
|-id=442 bgcolor=#E9E9E9
| 138442 ||  || — || April 27, 2000 || Anderson Mesa || LONEOS || GEF || align=right | 2.7 km || 
|-id=443 bgcolor=#E9E9E9
| 138443 ||  || — || April 25, 2000 || Kitt Peak || Spacewatch || — || align=right | 3.9 km || 
|-id=444 bgcolor=#E9E9E9
| 138444 ||  || — || May 1, 2000 || Socorro || LINEAR || KRM || align=right | 3.9 km || 
|-id=445 bgcolor=#fefefe
| 138445 Westenburger ||  ||  || May 2, 2000 || Drebach || J. Kandler || FLO || align=right | 1.2 km || 
|-id=446 bgcolor=#E9E9E9
| 138446 ||  || — || May 1, 2000 || Kitt Peak || Spacewatch || — || align=right | 4.3 km || 
|-id=447 bgcolor=#E9E9E9
| 138447 ||  || — || May 4, 2000 || Socorro || LINEAR || — || align=right | 3.0 km || 
|-id=448 bgcolor=#E9E9E9
| 138448 ||  || — || May 4, 2000 || Kitt Peak || Spacewatch || — || align=right | 3.5 km || 
|-id=449 bgcolor=#E9E9E9
| 138449 ||  || — || May 5, 2000 || Kitt Peak || Spacewatch || HEN || align=right | 2.2 km || 
|-id=450 bgcolor=#fefefe
| 138450 ||  || — || May 4, 2000 || Socorro || LINEAR || H || align=right | 1.2 km || 
|-id=451 bgcolor=#d6d6d6
| 138451 ||  || — || May 3, 2000 || Socorro || LINEAR || — || align=right | 4.5 km || 
|-id=452 bgcolor=#fefefe
| 138452 ||  || — || May 7, 2000 || Socorro || LINEAR || PHO || align=right | 2.5 km || 
|-id=453 bgcolor=#E9E9E9
| 138453 ||  || — || May 3, 2000 || Socorro || LINEAR || — || align=right | 5.6 km || 
|-id=454 bgcolor=#E9E9E9
| 138454 ||  || — || May 3, 2000 || Socorro || LINEAR || — || align=right | 3.5 km || 
|-id=455 bgcolor=#E9E9E9
| 138455 ||  || — || May 6, 2000 || Socorro || LINEAR || — || align=right | 4.5 km || 
|-id=456 bgcolor=#E9E9E9
| 138456 ||  || — || May 6, 2000 || Socorro || LINEAR || GEF || align=right | 5.3 km || 
|-id=457 bgcolor=#E9E9E9
| 138457 ||  || — || May 7, 2000 || Socorro || LINEAR || — || align=right | 4.3 km || 
|-id=458 bgcolor=#E9E9E9
| 138458 ||  || — || May 7, 2000 || Socorro || LINEAR || — || align=right | 3.9 km || 
|-id=459 bgcolor=#E9E9E9
| 138459 ||  || — || May 7, 2000 || Socorro || LINEAR || MRX || align=right | 2.4 km || 
|-id=460 bgcolor=#E9E9E9
| 138460 ||  || — || May 7, 2000 || Socorro || LINEAR || JUN || align=right | 1.9 km || 
|-id=461 bgcolor=#E9E9E9
| 138461 ||  || — || May 7, 2000 || Socorro || LINEAR || — || align=right | 3.7 km || 
|-id=462 bgcolor=#E9E9E9
| 138462 ||  || — || May 7, 2000 || Socorro || LINEAR || — || align=right | 2.3 km || 
|-id=463 bgcolor=#E9E9E9
| 138463 ||  || — || May 7, 2000 || Socorro || LINEAR || EUN || align=right | 1.8 km || 
|-id=464 bgcolor=#d6d6d6
| 138464 ||  || — || May 7, 2000 || Socorro || LINEAR || — || align=right | 2.9 km || 
|-id=465 bgcolor=#E9E9E9
| 138465 ||  || — || May 7, 2000 || Socorro || LINEAR || KON || align=right | 3.8 km || 
|-id=466 bgcolor=#E9E9E9
| 138466 ||  || — || May 7, 2000 || Socorro || LINEAR || NEM || align=right | 3.9 km || 
|-id=467 bgcolor=#E9E9E9
| 138467 ||  || — || May 7, 2000 || Socorro || LINEAR || — || align=right | 4.2 km || 
|-id=468 bgcolor=#fefefe
| 138468 ||  || — || May 7, 2000 || Socorro || LINEAR || — || align=right | 1.3 km || 
|-id=469 bgcolor=#E9E9E9
| 138469 ||  || — || May 6, 2000 || Socorro || LINEAR || DOR || align=right | 5.7 km || 
|-id=470 bgcolor=#E9E9E9
| 138470 ||  || — || May 7, 2000 || Socorro || LINEAR || — || align=right | 2.0 km || 
|-id=471 bgcolor=#E9E9E9
| 138471 ||  || — || May 5, 2000 || Anderson Mesa || LONEOS || — || align=right | 5.7 km || 
|-id=472 bgcolor=#E9E9E9
| 138472 ||  || — || May 7, 2000 || Socorro || LINEAR || — || align=right | 4.0 km || 
|-id=473 bgcolor=#E9E9E9
| 138473 ||  || — || May 4, 2000 || Kitt Peak || Spacewatch || — || align=right | 3.0 km || 
|-id=474 bgcolor=#fefefe
| 138474 ||  || — || May 5, 2000 || Socorro || LINEAR || NYS || align=right | 1.5 km || 
|-id=475 bgcolor=#E9E9E9
| 138475 ||  || — || May 5, 2000 || Socorro || LINEAR || EUN || align=right | 3.0 km || 
|-id=476 bgcolor=#E9E9E9
| 138476 ||  || — || May 4, 2000 || Anderson Mesa || LONEOS || ADE || align=right | 4.5 km || 
|-id=477 bgcolor=#d6d6d6
| 138477 ||  || — || May 1, 2000 || Kitt Peak || Spacewatch || — || align=right | 6.6 km || 
|-id=478 bgcolor=#E9E9E9
| 138478 ||  || — || May 2, 2000 || McDonald || T. L. Farnham || — || align=right | 2.6 km || 
|-id=479 bgcolor=#d6d6d6
| 138479 ||  || — || May 26, 2000 || Socorro || LINEAR || — || align=right | 7.5 km || 
|-id=480 bgcolor=#fefefe
| 138480 ||  || — || May 27, 2000 || Socorro || LINEAR || H || align=right data-sort-value="0.89" | 890 m || 
|-id=481 bgcolor=#E9E9E9
| 138481 ||  || — || May 26, 2000 || Kitt Peak || Spacewatch || — || align=right | 4.7 km || 
|-id=482 bgcolor=#fefefe
| 138482 ||  || — || May 27, 2000 || Socorro || LINEAR || H || align=right data-sort-value="0.89" | 890 m || 
|-id=483 bgcolor=#E9E9E9
| 138483 ||  || — || May 27, 2000 || Socorro || LINEAR || MIS || align=right | 3.4 km || 
|-id=484 bgcolor=#E9E9E9
| 138484 ||  || — || May 28, 2000 || Socorro || LINEAR || DOR || align=right | 5.4 km || 
|-id=485 bgcolor=#E9E9E9
| 138485 ||  || — || May 28, 2000 || Socorro || LINEAR || GER || align=right | 3.1 km || 
|-id=486 bgcolor=#E9E9E9
| 138486 ||  || — || May 28, 2000 || Socorro || LINEAR || NEM || align=right | 3.5 km || 
|-id=487 bgcolor=#E9E9E9
| 138487 ||  || — || May 28, 2000 || Socorro || LINEAR || ADE || align=right | 3.2 km || 
|-id=488 bgcolor=#E9E9E9
| 138488 ||  || — || May 28, 2000 || Socorro || LINEAR || — || align=right | 2.8 km || 
|-id=489 bgcolor=#fefefe
| 138489 ||  || — || May 28, 2000 || Socorro || LINEAR || MAS || align=right | 1.5 km || 
|-id=490 bgcolor=#E9E9E9
| 138490 ||  || — || May 28, 2000 || Socorro || LINEAR || — || align=right | 1.8 km || 
|-id=491 bgcolor=#E9E9E9
| 138491 ||  || — || May 28, 2000 || Socorro || LINEAR || GEF || align=right | 3.1 km || 
|-id=492 bgcolor=#E9E9E9
| 138492 ||  || — || May 27, 2000 || Socorro || LINEAR || — || align=right | 2.7 km || 
|-id=493 bgcolor=#E9E9E9
| 138493 ||  || — || May 27, 2000 || Socorro || LINEAR || — || align=right | 1.5 km || 
|-id=494 bgcolor=#E9E9E9
| 138494 ||  || — || May 24, 2000 || Kitt Peak || Spacewatch || AGN || align=right | 2.2 km || 
|-id=495 bgcolor=#E9E9E9
| 138495 ||  || — || May 24, 2000 || Kitt Peak || Spacewatch || MRX || align=right | 1.8 km || 
|-id=496 bgcolor=#E9E9E9
| 138496 ||  || — || May 24, 2000 || Kitt Peak || Spacewatch || — || align=right | 2.8 km || 
|-id=497 bgcolor=#fefefe
| 138497 ||  || — || May 25, 2000 || Kitt Peak || Spacewatch || — || align=right | 1.8 km || 
|-id=498 bgcolor=#E9E9E9
| 138498 ||  || — || May 25, 2000 || Kitt Peak || Spacewatch || AGN || align=right | 2.1 km || 
|-id=499 bgcolor=#E9E9E9
| 138499 ||  || — || May 26, 2000 || Kitt Peak || Spacewatch || — || align=right | 4.4 km || 
|-id=500 bgcolor=#E9E9E9
| 138500 ||  || — || May 30, 2000 || Kitt Peak || Spacewatch || — || align=right | 3.5 km || 
|}

138501–138600 

|-bgcolor=#E9E9E9
| 138501 ||  || — || May 23, 2000 || Anderson Mesa || LONEOS || — || align=right | 2.0 km || 
|-id=502 bgcolor=#E9E9E9
| 138502 ||  || — || May 24, 2000 || Anderson Mesa || LONEOS || DOR || align=right | 5.0 km || 
|-id=503 bgcolor=#fefefe
| 138503 ||  || — || May 24, 2000 || Anderson Mesa || LONEOS || — || align=right | 1.9 km || 
|-id=504 bgcolor=#fefefe
| 138504 ||  || — || May 26, 2000 || Anderson Mesa || LONEOS || — || align=right | 2.0 km || 
|-id=505 bgcolor=#E9E9E9
| 138505 ||  || — || May 26, 2000 || Anderson Mesa || LONEOS || — || align=right | 5.0 km || 
|-id=506 bgcolor=#E9E9E9
| 138506 ||  || — || May 27, 2000 || Socorro || LINEAR || — || align=right | 4.1 km || 
|-id=507 bgcolor=#E9E9E9
| 138507 ||  || — || May 30, 2000 || Socorro || LINEAR || — || align=right | 4.1 km || 
|-id=508 bgcolor=#fefefe
| 138508 ||  || — || May 29, 2000 || Socorro || LINEAR || H || align=right | 1.2 km || 
|-id=509 bgcolor=#d6d6d6
| 138509 ||  || — || May 28, 2000 || Socorro || LINEAR || — || align=right | 5.9 km || 
|-id=510 bgcolor=#E9E9E9
| 138510 ||  || — || May 27, 2000 || Socorro || LINEAR || — || align=right | 1.9 km || 
|-id=511 bgcolor=#d6d6d6
| 138511 ||  || — || May 25, 2000 || Anderson Mesa || LONEOS || — || align=right | 5.6 km || 
|-id=512 bgcolor=#d6d6d6
| 138512 ||  || — || June 3, 2000 || Anderson Mesa || LONEOS || Tj (2.85) || align=right | 12 km || 
|-id=513 bgcolor=#E9E9E9
| 138513 ||  || — || June 1, 2000 || Kitt Peak || Spacewatch || — || align=right | 3.8 km || 
|-id=514 bgcolor=#fefefe
| 138514 ||  || — || June 7, 2000 || Socorro || LINEAR || H || align=right | 1.2 km || 
|-id=515 bgcolor=#d6d6d6
| 138515 ||  || — || June 1, 2000 || Socorro || LINEAR || — || align=right | 4.4 km || 
|-id=516 bgcolor=#E9E9E9
| 138516 ||  || — || June 4, 2000 || Socorro || LINEAR || — || align=right | 3.0 km || 
|-id=517 bgcolor=#d6d6d6
| 138517 ||  || — || June 4, 2000 || Socorro || LINEAR || — || align=right | 3.7 km || 
|-id=518 bgcolor=#d6d6d6
| 138518 ||  || — || July 4, 2000 || Kitt Peak || Spacewatch || — || align=right | 4.1 km || 
|-id=519 bgcolor=#d6d6d6
| 138519 ||  || — || July 5, 2000 || Anderson Mesa || LONEOS || — || align=right | 5.0 km || 
|-id=520 bgcolor=#d6d6d6
| 138520 ||  || — || July 5, 2000 || Anderson Mesa || LONEOS || — || align=right | 8.5 km || 
|-id=521 bgcolor=#d6d6d6
| 138521 ||  || — || July 5, 2000 || Anderson Mesa || LONEOS || EOS || align=right | 3.8 km || 
|-id=522 bgcolor=#d6d6d6
| 138522 ||  || — || July 5, 2000 || Anderson Mesa || LONEOS || TIR || align=right | 9.4 km || 
|-id=523 bgcolor=#d6d6d6
| 138523 ||  || — || July 6, 2000 || Kitt Peak || Spacewatch || TIR || align=right | 6.3 km || 
|-id=524 bgcolor=#FFC2E0
| 138524 ||  || — || July 30, 2000 || Socorro || LINEAR || AMO +1kmPHA || align=right | 1.6 km || 
|-id=525 bgcolor=#fefefe
| 138525 ||  || — || July 23, 2000 || Socorro || LINEAR || H || align=right data-sort-value="0.95" | 950 m || 
|-id=526 bgcolor=#fefefe
| 138526 ||  || — || July 23, 2000 || Socorro || LINEAR || H || align=right | 1.4 km || 
|-id=527 bgcolor=#d6d6d6
| 138527 ||  || — || July 30, 2000 || Socorro || LINEAR || — || align=right | 8.0 km || 
|-id=528 bgcolor=#d6d6d6
| 138528 ||  || — || July 30, 2000 || Reedy Creek || J. Broughton || — || align=right | 7.0 km || 
|-id=529 bgcolor=#d6d6d6
| 138529 ||  || — || July 30, 2000 || Socorro || LINEAR || — || align=right | 7.2 km || 
|-id=530 bgcolor=#d6d6d6
| 138530 ||  || — || July 30, 2000 || Socorro || LINEAR || — || align=right | 7.4 km || 
|-id=531 bgcolor=#d6d6d6
| 138531 ||  || — || July 30, 2000 || Socorro || LINEAR || — || align=right | 8.3 km || 
|-id=532 bgcolor=#d6d6d6
| 138532 ||  || — || July 30, 2000 || Socorro || LINEAR || — || align=right | 3.2 km || 
|-id=533 bgcolor=#d6d6d6
| 138533 ||  || — || July 30, 2000 || Socorro || LINEAR || — || align=right | 9.5 km || 
|-id=534 bgcolor=#d6d6d6
| 138534 ||  || — || July 30, 2000 || Socorro || LINEAR || EOS || align=right | 3.8 km || 
|-id=535 bgcolor=#d6d6d6
| 138535 ||  || — || July 29, 2000 || Anderson Mesa || LONEOS || — || align=right | 5.7 km || 
|-id=536 bgcolor=#d6d6d6
| 138536 ||  || — || July 29, 2000 || Anderson Mesa || LONEOS || — || align=right | 6.7 km || 
|-id=537 bgcolor=#C2E0FF
| 138537 ||  || — || July 29, 2000 || Cerro Tololo || M. W. Buie, S. D. Kern || cubewano (cold) || align=right | 280 km || 
|-id=538 bgcolor=#fefefe
| 138538 ||  || — || August 1, 2000 || Socorro || LINEAR || H || align=right | 1.1 km || 
|-id=539 bgcolor=#d6d6d6
| 138539 ||  || — || August 5, 2000 || Haleakala || NEAT || EUP || align=right | 7.1 km || 
|-id=540 bgcolor=#d6d6d6
| 138540 ||  || — || August 1, 2000 || Socorro || LINEAR || — || align=right | 6.3 km || 
|-id=541 bgcolor=#E9E9E9
| 138541 ||  || — || August 1, 2000 || Socorro || LINEAR || GEF || align=right | 2.4 km || 
|-id=542 bgcolor=#d6d6d6
| 138542 ||  || — || August 3, 2000 || Kitt Peak || Spacewatch || — || align=right | 4.8 km || 
|-id=543 bgcolor=#d6d6d6
| 138543 ||  || — || August 25, 2000 || Gnosca || S. Sposetti || — || align=right | 7.4 km || 
|-id=544 bgcolor=#d6d6d6
| 138544 ||  || — || August 24, 2000 || Socorro || LINEAR || — || align=right | 6.3 km || 
|-id=545 bgcolor=#d6d6d6
| 138545 ||  || — || August 24, 2000 || Socorro || LINEAR || — || align=right | 6.1 km || 
|-id=546 bgcolor=#d6d6d6
| 138546 ||  || — || August 24, 2000 || Socorro || LINEAR || — || align=right | 3.9 km || 
|-id=547 bgcolor=#d6d6d6
| 138547 ||  || — || August 24, 2000 || Socorro || LINEAR || — || align=right | 2.3 km || 
|-id=548 bgcolor=#d6d6d6
| 138548 ||  || — || August 24, 2000 || Socorro || LINEAR || EOS || align=right | 3.7 km || 
|-id=549 bgcolor=#d6d6d6
| 138549 ||  || — || August 24, 2000 || Socorro || LINEAR || TIR || align=right | 5.4 km || 
|-id=550 bgcolor=#d6d6d6
| 138550 ||  || — || August 26, 2000 || Socorro || LINEAR || — || align=right | 6.6 km || 
|-id=551 bgcolor=#d6d6d6
| 138551 ||  || — || August 26, 2000 || Socorro || LINEAR || HYG || align=right | 5.6 km || 
|-id=552 bgcolor=#d6d6d6
| 138552 ||  || — || August 26, 2000 || Socorro || LINEAR || — || align=right | 3.4 km || 
|-id=553 bgcolor=#d6d6d6
| 138553 ||  || — || August 24, 2000 || Socorro || LINEAR || EMA || align=right | 6.2 km || 
|-id=554 bgcolor=#d6d6d6
| 138554 ||  || — || August 24, 2000 || Socorro || LINEAR || KOR || align=right | 2.4 km || 
|-id=555 bgcolor=#d6d6d6
| 138555 ||  || — || August 24, 2000 || Socorro || LINEAR || — || align=right | 3.9 km || 
|-id=556 bgcolor=#d6d6d6
| 138556 ||  || — || August 24, 2000 || Socorro || LINEAR || — || align=right | 5.3 km || 
|-id=557 bgcolor=#d6d6d6
| 138557 ||  || — || August 24, 2000 || Socorro || LINEAR || — || align=right | 6.0 km || 
|-id=558 bgcolor=#d6d6d6
| 138558 ||  || — || August 24, 2000 || Socorro || LINEAR || — || align=right | 5.0 km || 
|-id=559 bgcolor=#d6d6d6
| 138559 ||  || — || August 26, 2000 || Socorro || LINEAR || THM || align=right | 3.8 km || 
|-id=560 bgcolor=#d6d6d6
| 138560 ||  || — || August 26, 2000 || Socorro || LINEAR || — || align=right | 6.0 km || 
|-id=561 bgcolor=#fefefe
| 138561 ||  || — || August 28, 2000 || Socorro || LINEAR || — || align=right | 1.3 km || 
|-id=562 bgcolor=#d6d6d6
| 138562 ||  || — || August 28, 2000 || Socorro || LINEAR || — || align=right | 5.7 km || 
|-id=563 bgcolor=#d6d6d6
| 138563 ||  || — || August 27, 2000 || Fair Oaks Ranch || J. V. McClusky || ALA || align=right | 7.3 km || 
|-id=564 bgcolor=#d6d6d6
| 138564 ||  || — || August 24, 2000 || Socorro || LINEAR || — || align=right | 5.2 km || 
|-id=565 bgcolor=#d6d6d6
| 138565 ||  || — || August 24, 2000 || Socorro || LINEAR || — || align=right | 7.1 km || 
|-id=566 bgcolor=#d6d6d6
| 138566 ||  || — || August 24, 2000 || Socorro || LINEAR || — || align=right | 6.7 km || 
|-id=567 bgcolor=#d6d6d6
| 138567 ||  || — || August 24, 2000 || Socorro || LINEAR || — || align=right | 4.7 km || 
|-id=568 bgcolor=#d6d6d6
| 138568 ||  || — || August 24, 2000 || Socorro || LINEAR || EOS || align=right | 3.5 km || 
|-id=569 bgcolor=#d6d6d6
| 138569 ||  || — || August 24, 2000 || Socorro || LINEAR || VER || align=right | 6.3 km || 
|-id=570 bgcolor=#fefefe
| 138570 ||  || — || August 25, 2000 || Socorro || LINEAR || — || align=right | 1.5 km || 
|-id=571 bgcolor=#d6d6d6
| 138571 ||  || — || August 25, 2000 || Socorro || LINEAR || — || align=right | 6.7 km || 
|-id=572 bgcolor=#d6d6d6
| 138572 ||  || — || August 25, 2000 || Socorro || LINEAR || — || align=right | 6.9 km || 
|-id=573 bgcolor=#d6d6d6
| 138573 ||  || — || August 29, 2000 || Socorro || LINEAR || HYG || align=right | 6.2 km || 
|-id=574 bgcolor=#d6d6d6
| 138574 ||  || — || August 31, 2000 || Kitt Peak || Spacewatch || EOS || align=right | 3.4 km || 
|-id=575 bgcolor=#d6d6d6
| 138575 ||  || — || August 24, 2000 || Socorro || LINEAR || — || align=right | 5.5 km || 
|-id=576 bgcolor=#d6d6d6
| 138576 ||  || — || August 24, 2000 || Socorro || LINEAR || — || align=right | 5.2 km || 
|-id=577 bgcolor=#d6d6d6
| 138577 ||  || — || August 25, 2000 || Socorro || LINEAR || EUP || align=right | 9.6 km || 
|-id=578 bgcolor=#d6d6d6
| 138578 ||  || — || August 28, 2000 || Socorro || LINEAR || — || align=right | 8.4 km || 
|-id=579 bgcolor=#d6d6d6
| 138579 ||  || — || August 26, 2000 || Socorro || LINEAR || TIR || align=right | 6.1 km || 
|-id=580 bgcolor=#d6d6d6
| 138580 ||  || — || August 26, 2000 || Socorro || LINEAR || — || align=right | 7.8 km || 
|-id=581 bgcolor=#d6d6d6
| 138581 ||  || — || August 26, 2000 || Socorro || LINEAR || — || align=right | 4.9 km || 
|-id=582 bgcolor=#d6d6d6
| 138582 ||  || — || August 26, 2000 || Socorro || LINEAR || HYG || align=right | 5.4 km || 
|-id=583 bgcolor=#d6d6d6
| 138583 ||  || — || August 29, 2000 || Socorro || LINEAR || — || align=right | 5.8 km || 
|-id=584 bgcolor=#d6d6d6
| 138584 ||  || — || August 31, 2000 || Socorro || LINEAR || HYG || align=right | 6.9 km || 
|-id=585 bgcolor=#d6d6d6
| 138585 ||  || — || August 31, 2000 || Socorro || LINEAR || — || align=right | 5.6 km || 
|-id=586 bgcolor=#d6d6d6
| 138586 ||  || — || August 31, 2000 || Socorro || LINEAR || — || align=right | 5.2 km || 
|-id=587 bgcolor=#d6d6d6
| 138587 ||  || — || August 31, 2000 || Socorro || LINEAR || THM || align=right | 3.7 km || 
|-id=588 bgcolor=#fefefe
| 138588 ||  || — || August 31, 2000 || Socorro || LINEAR || — || align=right | 1.8 km || 
|-id=589 bgcolor=#d6d6d6
| 138589 ||  || — || August 31, 2000 || Socorro || LINEAR || — || align=right | 6.7 km || 
|-id=590 bgcolor=#d6d6d6
| 138590 ||  || — || August 31, 2000 || Socorro || LINEAR || — || align=right | 5.8 km || 
|-id=591 bgcolor=#d6d6d6
| 138591 ||  || — || August 31, 2000 || Socorro || LINEAR || — || align=right | 5.3 km || 
|-id=592 bgcolor=#d6d6d6
| 138592 ||  || — || August 31, 2000 || Socorro || LINEAR || EOS || align=right | 4.6 km || 
|-id=593 bgcolor=#d6d6d6
| 138593 ||  || — || August 31, 2000 || Socorro || LINEAR || — || align=right | 6.3 km || 
|-id=594 bgcolor=#d6d6d6
| 138594 ||  || — || August 31, 2000 || Socorro || LINEAR || — || align=right | 6.8 km || 
|-id=595 bgcolor=#d6d6d6
| 138595 ||  || — || August 31, 2000 || Socorro || LINEAR || — || align=right | 5.3 km || 
|-id=596 bgcolor=#d6d6d6
| 138596 ||  || — || August 31, 2000 || Socorro || LINEAR || LIX || align=right | 5.0 km || 
|-id=597 bgcolor=#d6d6d6
| 138597 ||  || — || August 31, 2000 || Socorro || LINEAR || — || align=right | 7.6 km || 
|-id=598 bgcolor=#d6d6d6
| 138598 ||  || — || August 31, 2000 || Socorro || LINEAR || VER || align=right | 5.0 km || 
|-id=599 bgcolor=#fefefe
| 138599 ||  || — || August 31, 2000 || Socorro || LINEAR || V || align=right | 1.7 km || 
|-id=600 bgcolor=#d6d6d6
| 138600 ||  || — || August 31, 2000 || Socorro || LINEAR || EOS || align=right | 3.6 km || 
|}

138601–138700 

|-bgcolor=#d6d6d6
| 138601 ||  || — || August 31, 2000 || Socorro || LINEAR || — || align=right | 5.4 km || 
|-id=602 bgcolor=#d6d6d6
| 138602 ||  || — || August 31, 2000 || Socorro || LINEAR || — || align=right | 5.4 km || 
|-id=603 bgcolor=#d6d6d6
| 138603 ||  || — || August 31, 2000 || Socorro || LINEAR || — || align=right | 6.9 km || 
|-id=604 bgcolor=#d6d6d6
| 138604 ||  || — || August 31, 2000 || Socorro || LINEAR || — || align=right | 3.4 km || 
|-id=605 bgcolor=#d6d6d6
| 138605 ||  || — || August 31, 2000 || Socorro || LINEAR || — || align=right | 5.2 km || 
|-id=606 bgcolor=#d6d6d6
| 138606 ||  || — || August 31, 2000 || Socorro || LINEAR || HYG || align=right | 6.6 km || 
|-id=607 bgcolor=#d6d6d6
| 138607 ||  || — || August 26, 2000 || Socorro || LINEAR || — || align=right | 7.9 km || 
|-id=608 bgcolor=#d6d6d6
| 138608 ||  || — || August 26, 2000 || Socorro || LINEAR || — || align=right | 7.9 km || 
|-id=609 bgcolor=#d6d6d6
| 138609 ||  || — || August 26, 2000 || Socorro || LINEAR || HYG || align=right | 5.4 km || 
|-id=610 bgcolor=#d6d6d6
| 138610 ||  || — || August 26, 2000 || Socorro || LINEAR || HYG || align=right | 7.7 km || 
|-id=611 bgcolor=#d6d6d6
| 138611 ||  || — || August 26, 2000 || Socorro || LINEAR || — || align=right | 7.6 km || 
|-id=612 bgcolor=#d6d6d6
| 138612 ||  || — || August 31, 2000 || Socorro || LINEAR || — || align=right | 5.9 km || 
|-id=613 bgcolor=#d6d6d6
| 138613 ||  || — || August 29, 2000 || Socorro || LINEAR || — || align=right | 7.2 km || 
|-id=614 bgcolor=#d6d6d6
| 138614 ||  || — || August 29, 2000 || Socorro || LINEAR || — || align=right | 6.6 km || 
|-id=615 bgcolor=#d6d6d6
| 138615 ||  || — || August 29, 2000 || Socorro || LINEAR || — || align=right | 6.1 km || 
|-id=616 bgcolor=#d6d6d6
| 138616 ||  || — || August 31, 2000 || Socorro || LINEAR || HYG || align=right | 4.6 km || 
|-id=617 bgcolor=#d6d6d6
| 138617 ||  || — || August 31, 2000 || Socorro || LINEAR || LIX || align=right | 6.4 km || 
|-id=618 bgcolor=#d6d6d6
| 138618 ||  || — || August 31, 2000 || Socorro || LINEAR || — || align=right | 3.2 km || 
|-id=619 bgcolor=#d6d6d6
| 138619 ||  || — || August 31, 2000 || Socorro || LINEAR || — || align=right | 6.1 km || 
|-id=620 bgcolor=#d6d6d6
| 138620 ||  || — || August 21, 2000 || Anderson Mesa || LONEOS || — || align=right | 5.1 km || 
|-id=621 bgcolor=#d6d6d6
| 138621 ||  || — || August 21, 2000 || Anderson Mesa || LONEOS || — || align=right | 5.3 km || 
|-id=622 bgcolor=#d6d6d6
| 138622 ||  || — || August 21, 2000 || Anderson Mesa || LONEOS || EMA || align=right | 5.4 km || 
|-id=623 bgcolor=#d6d6d6
| 138623 ||  || — || August 29, 2000 || Socorro || LINEAR || — || align=right | 5.2 km || 
|-id=624 bgcolor=#d6d6d6
| 138624 ||  || — || August 31, 2000 || Socorro || LINEAR || — || align=right | 4.8 km || 
|-id=625 bgcolor=#d6d6d6
| 138625 ||  || — || August 24, 2000 || Socorro || LINEAR || — || align=right | 3.8 km || 
|-id=626 bgcolor=#d6d6d6
| 138626 ||  || — || August 28, 2000 || Cerro Tololo || M. W. Buie || — || align=right | 4.2 km || 
|-id=627 bgcolor=#d6d6d6
| 138627 ||  || — || August 20, 2000 || Anderson Mesa || LONEOS || — || align=right | 4.6 km || 
|-id=628 bgcolor=#C2E0FF
| 138628 ||  || — || August 25, 2000 || Cerro Tololo || M. W. Buie || other TNOcritical || align=right | 161 km || 
|-id=629 bgcolor=#d6d6d6
| 138629 || 2000 RR || — || September 1, 2000 || Socorro || LINEAR || EUP || align=right | 6.9 km || 
|-id=630 bgcolor=#d6d6d6
| 138630 || 2000 RU || — || September 1, 2000 || Socorro || LINEAR || — || align=right | 7.8 km || 
|-id=631 bgcolor=#E9E9E9
| 138631 ||  || — || September 1, 2000 || Socorro || LINEAR || — || align=right | 4.2 km || 
|-id=632 bgcolor=#d6d6d6
| 138632 ||  || — || September 1, 2000 || Socorro || LINEAR || — || align=right | 5.8 km || 
|-id=633 bgcolor=#d6d6d6
| 138633 ||  || — || September 1, 2000 || Socorro || LINEAR || ALA || align=right | 7.0 km || 
|-id=634 bgcolor=#d6d6d6
| 138634 ||  || — || September 1, 2000 || Socorro || LINEAR || — || align=right | 7.0 km || 
|-id=635 bgcolor=#d6d6d6
| 138635 ||  || — || September 1, 2000 || Socorro || LINEAR || — || align=right | 5.3 km || 
|-id=636 bgcolor=#d6d6d6
| 138636 ||  || — || September 1, 2000 || Socorro || LINEAR || — || align=right | 6.6 km || 
|-id=637 bgcolor=#d6d6d6
| 138637 ||  || — || September 1, 2000 || Socorro || LINEAR || — || align=right | 8.2 km || 
|-id=638 bgcolor=#d6d6d6
| 138638 ||  || — || September 1, 2000 || Socorro || LINEAR || — || align=right | 6.0 km || 
|-id=639 bgcolor=#d6d6d6
| 138639 ||  || — || September 1, 2000 || Socorro || LINEAR || TIR || align=right | 5.2 km || 
|-id=640 bgcolor=#d6d6d6
| 138640 ||  || — || September 1, 2000 || Socorro || LINEAR || MEL || align=right | 7.8 km || 
|-id=641 bgcolor=#E9E9E9
| 138641 ||  || — || September 1, 2000 || Socorro || LINEAR || — || align=right | 4.7 km || 
|-id=642 bgcolor=#d6d6d6
| 138642 ||  || — || September 1, 2000 || Socorro || LINEAR || CHA || align=right | 3.9 km || 
|-id=643 bgcolor=#d6d6d6
| 138643 ||  || — || September 1, 2000 || Socorro || LINEAR || — || align=right | 6.0 km || 
|-id=644 bgcolor=#d6d6d6
| 138644 ||  || — || September 1, 2000 || Socorro || LINEAR || — || align=right | 6.7 km || 
|-id=645 bgcolor=#d6d6d6
| 138645 ||  || — || September 1, 2000 || Socorro || LINEAR || — || align=right | 6.1 km || 
|-id=646 bgcolor=#d6d6d6
| 138646 ||  || — || September 1, 2000 || Socorro || LINEAR || — || align=right | 3.5 km || 
|-id=647 bgcolor=#d6d6d6
| 138647 ||  || — || September 1, 2000 || Socorro || LINEAR || — || align=right | 6.6 km || 
|-id=648 bgcolor=#d6d6d6
| 138648 ||  || — || September 1, 2000 || Socorro || LINEAR || — || align=right | 5.6 km || 
|-id=649 bgcolor=#d6d6d6
| 138649 ||  || — || September 3, 2000 || Socorro || LINEAR || — || align=right | 6.2 km || 
|-id=650 bgcolor=#d6d6d6
| 138650 ||  || — || September 1, 2000 || Socorro || LINEAR || — || align=right | 7.3 km || 
|-id=651 bgcolor=#d6d6d6
| 138651 ||  || — || September 7, 2000 || Kitt Peak || Spacewatch || HYG || align=right | 5.3 km || 
|-id=652 bgcolor=#d6d6d6
| 138652 ||  || — || September 3, 2000 || Socorro || LINEAR || — || align=right | 8.4 km || 
|-id=653 bgcolor=#d6d6d6
| 138653 ||  || — || September 4, 2000 || Socorro || LINEAR || — || align=right | 6.8 km || 
|-id=654 bgcolor=#d6d6d6
| 138654 ||  || — || September 8, 2000 || Ondřejov || L. Kotková || MEL || align=right | 7.7 km || 
|-id=655 bgcolor=#d6d6d6
| 138655 ||  || — || September 1, 2000 || Socorro || LINEAR || ALA || align=right | 5.8 km || 
|-id=656 bgcolor=#d6d6d6
| 138656 ||  || — || September 1, 2000 || Socorro || LINEAR || — || align=right | 6.3 km || 
|-id=657 bgcolor=#d6d6d6
| 138657 ||  || — || September 1, 2000 || Socorro || LINEAR || — || align=right | 8.9 km || 
|-id=658 bgcolor=#d6d6d6
| 138658 ||  || — || September 2, 2000 || Socorro || LINEAR || EMA || align=right | 5.7 km || 
|-id=659 bgcolor=#d6d6d6
| 138659 ||  || — || September 3, 2000 || Socorro || LINEAR || — || align=right | 5.3 km || 
|-id=660 bgcolor=#E9E9E9
| 138660 ||  || — || September 3, 2000 || Socorro || LINEAR || — || align=right | 4.1 km || 
|-id=661 bgcolor=#d6d6d6
| 138661 ||  || — || September 3, 2000 || Socorro || LINEAR || — || align=right | 6.4 km || 
|-id=662 bgcolor=#d6d6d6
| 138662 ||  || — || September 3, 2000 || Socorro || LINEAR || EOS || align=right | 7.2 km || 
|-id=663 bgcolor=#d6d6d6
| 138663 ||  || — || September 3, 2000 || Socorro || LINEAR || EOS || align=right | 4.3 km || 
|-id=664 bgcolor=#d6d6d6
| 138664 ||  || — || September 4, 2000 || Anderson Mesa || LONEOS || — || align=right | 6.2 km || 
|-id=665 bgcolor=#d6d6d6
| 138665 ||  || — || September 4, 2000 || Haleakala || NEAT || — || align=right | 4.7 km || 
|-id=666 bgcolor=#fefefe
| 138666 ||  || — || September 5, 2000 || Anderson Mesa || LONEOS || H || align=right | 1.7 km || 
|-id=667 bgcolor=#d6d6d6
| 138667 ||  || — || September 5, 2000 || Anderson Mesa || LONEOS || — || align=right | 5.6 km || 
|-id=668 bgcolor=#d6d6d6
| 138668 ||  || — || September 5, 2000 || Anderson Mesa || LONEOS || LIX || align=right | 7.3 km || 
|-id=669 bgcolor=#d6d6d6
| 138669 ||  || — || September 6, 2000 || Socorro || LINEAR || — || align=right | 6.8 km || 
|-id=670 bgcolor=#E9E9E9
| 138670 ||  || — || September 3, 2000 || Socorro || LINEAR || — || align=right | 2.9 km || 
|-id=671 bgcolor=#d6d6d6
| 138671 ||  || — || September 20, 2000 || Socorro || LINEAR || — || align=right | 7.6 km || 
|-id=672 bgcolor=#d6d6d6
| 138672 ||  || — || September 22, 2000 || Kitt Peak || Spacewatch || — || align=right | 6.0 km || 
|-id=673 bgcolor=#d6d6d6
| 138673 ||  || — || September 20, 2000 || Socorro || LINEAR || — || align=right | 6.1 km || 
|-id=674 bgcolor=#d6d6d6
| 138674 ||  || — || September 20, 2000 || Socorro || LINEAR || — || align=right | 8.6 km || 
|-id=675 bgcolor=#fefefe
| 138675 ||  || — || September 23, 2000 || Prescott || P. G. Comba || — || align=right | 1.0 km || 
|-id=676 bgcolor=#d6d6d6
| 138676 ||  || — || September 23, 2000 || Socorro || LINEAR || — || align=right | 6.5 km || 
|-id=677 bgcolor=#d6d6d6
| 138677 ||  || — || September 23, 2000 || Socorro || LINEAR || — || align=right | 5.9 km || 
|-id=678 bgcolor=#E9E9E9
| 138678 ||  || — || September 26, 2000 || Desert Beaver || W. K. Y. Yeung || — || align=right | 2.4 km || 
|-id=679 bgcolor=#d6d6d6
| 138679 ||  || — || September 24, 2000 || Socorro || LINEAR || KOR || align=right | 2.6 km || 
|-id=680 bgcolor=#d6d6d6
| 138680 ||  || — || September 24, 2000 || Socorro || LINEAR || — || align=right | 4.9 km || 
|-id=681 bgcolor=#d6d6d6
| 138681 ||  || — || September 24, 2000 || Socorro || LINEAR || — || align=right | 5.9 km || 
|-id=682 bgcolor=#d6d6d6
| 138682 ||  || — || September 24, 2000 || Socorro || LINEAR || VER || align=right | 5.5 km || 
|-id=683 bgcolor=#d6d6d6
| 138683 ||  || — || September 24, 2000 || Socorro || LINEAR || THM || align=right | 4.1 km || 
|-id=684 bgcolor=#d6d6d6
| 138684 ||  || — || September 24, 2000 || Socorro || LINEAR || — || align=right | 5.5 km || 
|-id=685 bgcolor=#d6d6d6
| 138685 ||  || — || September 22, 2000 || Socorro || LINEAR || ALA || align=right | 6.4 km || 
|-id=686 bgcolor=#d6d6d6
| 138686 ||  || — || September 23, 2000 || Socorro || LINEAR || EOS || align=right | 3.8 km || 
|-id=687 bgcolor=#d6d6d6
| 138687 ||  || — || September 23, 2000 || Socorro || LINEAR || — || align=right | 6.1 km || 
|-id=688 bgcolor=#d6d6d6
| 138688 ||  || — || September 24, 2000 || Socorro || LINEAR || — || align=right | 4.2 km || 
|-id=689 bgcolor=#d6d6d6
| 138689 ||  || — || September 24, 2000 || Socorro || LINEAR || — || align=right | 6.1 km || 
|-id=690 bgcolor=#d6d6d6
| 138690 ||  || — || September 24, 2000 || Socorro || LINEAR || THM || align=right | 3.3 km || 
|-id=691 bgcolor=#d6d6d6
| 138691 ||  || — || September 24, 2000 || Socorro || LINEAR || ALAslow || align=right | 8.2 km || 
|-id=692 bgcolor=#d6d6d6
| 138692 ||  || — || September 24, 2000 || Socorro || LINEAR || — || align=right | 6.2 km || 
|-id=693 bgcolor=#d6d6d6
| 138693 ||  || — || September 24, 2000 || Socorro || LINEAR || HYG || align=right | 3.9 km || 
|-id=694 bgcolor=#d6d6d6
| 138694 ||  || — || September 24, 2000 || Socorro || LINEAR || ALA || align=right | 5.6 km || 
|-id=695 bgcolor=#d6d6d6
| 138695 ||  || — || September 24, 2000 || Socorro || LINEAR || — || align=right | 4.1 km || 
|-id=696 bgcolor=#d6d6d6
| 138696 ||  || — || September 24, 2000 || Socorro || LINEAR || — || align=right | 5.9 km || 
|-id=697 bgcolor=#fefefe
| 138697 ||  || — || September 24, 2000 || Socorro || LINEAR || — || align=right | 1.5 km || 
|-id=698 bgcolor=#d6d6d6
| 138698 ||  || — || September 24, 2000 || Socorro || LINEAR || — || align=right | 2.9 km || 
|-id=699 bgcolor=#d6d6d6
| 138699 ||  || — || September 24, 2000 || Socorro || LINEAR || 7:4 || align=right | 4.9 km || 
|-id=700 bgcolor=#d6d6d6
| 138700 ||  || — || September 24, 2000 || Socorro || LINEAR || — || align=right | 3.8 km || 
|}

138701–138800 

|-bgcolor=#d6d6d6
| 138701 ||  || — || September 24, 2000 || Socorro || LINEAR || — || align=right | 4.6 km || 
|-id=702 bgcolor=#fefefe
| 138702 ||  || — || September 24, 2000 || Socorro || LINEAR || — || align=right | 1.8 km || 
|-id=703 bgcolor=#d6d6d6
| 138703 ||  || — || September 28, 2000 || Socorro || LINEAR || — || align=right | 7.2 km || 
|-id=704 bgcolor=#d6d6d6
| 138704 ||  || — || September 22, 2000 || Socorro || LINEAR || — || align=right | 7.1 km || 
|-id=705 bgcolor=#d6d6d6
| 138705 ||  || — || September 22, 2000 || Socorro || LINEAR || ALA || align=right | 11 km || 
|-id=706 bgcolor=#d6d6d6
| 138706 ||  || — || September 23, 2000 || Socorro || LINEAR || EOS || align=right | 6.0 km || 
|-id=707 bgcolor=#d6d6d6
| 138707 ||  || — || September 23, 2000 || Socorro || LINEAR || — || align=right | 6.2 km || 
|-id=708 bgcolor=#d6d6d6
| 138708 ||  || — || September 23, 2000 || Socorro || LINEAR || — || align=right | 6.1 km || 
|-id=709 bgcolor=#d6d6d6
| 138709 ||  || — || September 24, 2000 || Socorro || LINEAR || — || align=right | 5.3 km || 
|-id=710 bgcolor=#d6d6d6
| 138710 ||  || — || September 24, 2000 || Socorro || LINEAR || HYG || align=right | 5.7 km || 
|-id=711 bgcolor=#E9E9E9
| 138711 ||  || — || September 24, 2000 || Socorro || LINEAR || HEN || align=right | 1.7 km || 
|-id=712 bgcolor=#d6d6d6
| 138712 ||  || — || September 24, 2000 || Socorro || LINEAR || — || align=right | 3.7 km || 
|-id=713 bgcolor=#fefefe
| 138713 ||  || — || September 24, 2000 || Socorro || LINEAR || NYS || align=right | 1.3 km || 
|-id=714 bgcolor=#d6d6d6
| 138714 ||  || — || September 24, 2000 || Socorro || LINEAR || HYG || align=right | 5.0 km || 
|-id=715 bgcolor=#d6d6d6
| 138715 ||  || — || September 22, 2000 || Socorro || LINEAR || — || align=right | 7.8 km || 
|-id=716 bgcolor=#d6d6d6
| 138716 ||  || — || September 22, 2000 || Socorro || LINEAR || THB || align=right | 8.0 km || 
|-id=717 bgcolor=#d6d6d6
| 138717 ||  || — || September 23, 2000 || Socorro || LINEAR || — || align=right | 8.8 km || 
|-id=718 bgcolor=#d6d6d6
| 138718 ||  || — || September 23, 2000 || Socorro || LINEAR || HYG || align=right | 5.2 km || 
|-id=719 bgcolor=#d6d6d6
| 138719 ||  || — || September 24, 2000 || Socorro || LINEAR || EOS || align=right | 4.1 km || 
|-id=720 bgcolor=#d6d6d6
| 138720 ||  || — || September 25, 2000 || Socorro || LINEAR || ALA || align=right | 7.7 km || 
|-id=721 bgcolor=#d6d6d6
| 138721 ||  || — || September 26, 2000 || Socorro || LINEAR || — || align=right | 7.9 km || 
|-id=722 bgcolor=#d6d6d6
| 138722 ||  || — || September 26, 2000 || Socorro || LINEAR || — || align=right | 5.5 km || 
|-id=723 bgcolor=#d6d6d6
| 138723 ||  || — || September 27, 2000 || Kitt Peak || Spacewatch || THM || align=right | 3.8 km || 
|-id=724 bgcolor=#fefefe
| 138724 ||  || — || September 23, 2000 || Socorro || LINEAR || — || align=right | 1.5 km || 
|-id=725 bgcolor=#d6d6d6
| 138725 ||  || — || September 28, 2000 || Socorro || LINEAR || — || align=right | 6.5 km || 
|-id=726 bgcolor=#d6d6d6
| 138726 ||  || — || September 28, 2000 || Socorro || LINEAR || — || align=right | 5.9 km || 
|-id=727 bgcolor=#FFC2E0
| 138727 ||  || — || September 27, 2000 || Socorro || LINEAR || APOPHAcritical || align=right data-sort-value="0.56" | 560 m || 
|-id=728 bgcolor=#d6d6d6
| 138728 ||  || — || September 21, 2000 || Haleakala || NEAT || EOS || align=right | 3.9 km || 
|-id=729 bgcolor=#d6d6d6
| 138729 ||  || — || September 21, 2000 || Haleakala || NEAT || — || align=right | 7.8 km || 
|-id=730 bgcolor=#d6d6d6
| 138730 ||  || — || September 21, 2000 || Haleakala || NEAT || CRO || align=right | 5.3 km || 
|-id=731 bgcolor=#d6d6d6
| 138731 ||  || — || September 24, 2000 || Socorro || LINEAR || — || align=right | 4.7 km || 
|-id=732 bgcolor=#d6d6d6
| 138732 ||  || — || September 24, 2000 || Socorro || LINEAR || — || align=right | 4.0 km || 
|-id=733 bgcolor=#d6d6d6
| 138733 ||  || — || September 24, 2000 || Socorro || LINEAR || HYG || align=right | 4.0 km || 
|-id=734 bgcolor=#d6d6d6
| 138734 ||  || — || September 24, 2000 || Socorro || LINEAR || — || align=right | 5.2 km || 
|-id=735 bgcolor=#d6d6d6
| 138735 ||  || — || September 24, 2000 || Socorro || LINEAR || VER || align=right | 4.9 km || 
|-id=736 bgcolor=#d6d6d6
| 138736 ||  || — || September 24, 2000 || Socorro || LINEAR || THM || align=right | 4.8 km || 
|-id=737 bgcolor=#d6d6d6
| 138737 ||  || — || September 24, 2000 || Socorro || LINEAR || THM || align=right | 3.7 km || 
|-id=738 bgcolor=#d6d6d6
| 138738 ||  || — || September 24, 2000 || Socorro || LINEAR || — || align=right | 5.0 km || 
|-id=739 bgcolor=#d6d6d6
| 138739 ||  || — || September 24, 2000 || Socorro || LINEAR || 2:1J || align=right | 4.3 km || 
|-id=740 bgcolor=#d6d6d6
| 138740 ||  || — || September 25, 2000 || Socorro || LINEAR || — || align=right | 6.0 km || 
|-id=741 bgcolor=#d6d6d6
| 138741 ||  || — || September 25, 2000 || Socorro || LINEAR || — || align=right | 6.6 km || 
|-id=742 bgcolor=#d6d6d6
| 138742 ||  || — || September 27, 2000 || Socorro || LINEAR || EUP || align=right | 7.8 km || 
|-id=743 bgcolor=#d6d6d6
| 138743 ||  || — || September 27, 2000 || Socorro || LINEAR || KOR || align=right | 2.4 km || 
|-id=744 bgcolor=#d6d6d6
| 138744 ||  || — || September 24, 2000 || Socorro || LINEAR || THM || align=right | 3.8 km || 
|-id=745 bgcolor=#d6d6d6
| 138745 ||  || — || September 24, 2000 || Socorro || LINEAR || — || align=right | 4.4 km || 
|-id=746 bgcolor=#d6d6d6
| 138746 ||  || — || September 24, 2000 || Socorro || LINEAR || — || align=right | 5.8 km || 
|-id=747 bgcolor=#d6d6d6
| 138747 ||  || — || September 24, 2000 || Socorro || LINEAR || VER || align=right | 8.0 km || 
|-id=748 bgcolor=#d6d6d6
| 138748 ||  || — || September 24, 2000 || Socorro || LINEAR || — || align=right | 8.1 km || 
|-id=749 bgcolor=#d6d6d6
| 138749 ||  || — || September 24, 2000 || Socorro || LINEAR || — || align=right | 10 km || 
|-id=750 bgcolor=#d6d6d6
| 138750 ||  || — || September 24, 2000 || Socorro || LINEAR || — || align=right | 4.5 km || 
|-id=751 bgcolor=#d6d6d6
| 138751 ||  || — || September 24, 2000 || Socorro || LINEAR || VER || align=right | 4.9 km || 
|-id=752 bgcolor=#d6d6d6
| 138752 ||  || — || September 24, 2000 || Socorro || LINEAR || — || align=right | 6.4 km || 
|-id=753 bgcolor=#d6d6d6
| 138753 ||  || — || September 27, 2000 || Socorro || LINEAR || — || align=right | 5.4 km || 
|-id=754 bgcolor=#d6d6d6
| 138754 ||  || — || September 28, 2000 || Socorro || LINEAR || — || align=right | 6.3 km || 
|-id=755 bgcolor=#d6d6d6
| 138755 ||  || — || September 28, 2000 || Socorro || LINEAR || — || align=right | 4.0 km || 
|-id=756 bgcolor=#d6d6d6
| 138756 ||  || — || September 28, 2000 || Socorro || LINEAR || Tj (2.92) || align=right | 3.5 km || 
|-id=757 bgcolor=#d6d6d6
| 138757 ||  || — || September 30, 2000 || Socorro || LINEAR || — || align=right | 6.8 km || 
|-id=758 bgcolor=#d6d6d6
| 138758 ||  || — || September 30, 2000 || Socorro || LINEAR || VER || align=right | 6.2 km || 
|-id=759 bgcolor=#d6d6d6
| 138759 ||  || — || September 23, 2000 || Socorro || LINEAR || — || align=right | 4.9 km || 
|-id=760 bgcolor=#d6d6d6
| 138760 ||  || — || September 23, 2000 || Socorro || LINEAR || — || align=right | 4.9 km || 
|-id=761 bgcolor=#d6d6d6
| 138761 ||  || — || September 26, 2000 || Socorro || LINEAR || EUP || align=right | 6.9 km || 
|-id=762 bgcolor=#d6d6d6
| 138762 ||  || — || September 26, 2000 || Socorro || LINEAR || — || align=right | 5.5 km || 
|-id=763 bgcolor=#d6d6d6
| 138763 ||  || — || September 27, 2000 || Socorro || LINEAR || HYG || align=right | 5.4 km || 
|-id=764 bgcolor=#d6d6d6
| 138764 ||  || — || September 27, 2000 || Socorro || LINEAR || — || align=right | 8.8 km || 
|-id=765 bgcolor=#d6d6d6
| 138765 ||  || — || September 30, 2000 || Socorro || LINEAR || — || align=right | 5.7 km || 
|-id=766 bgcolor=#d6d6d6
| 138766 ||  || — || September 30, 2000 || Socorro || LINEAR || — || align=right | 5.9 km || 
|-id=767 bgcolor=#d6d6d6
| 138767 ||  || — || September 27, 2000 || Socorro || LINEAR || — || align=right | 6.2 km || 
|-id=768 bgcolor=#d6d6d6
| 138768 ||  || — || September 28, 2000 || Socorro || LINEAR || — || align=right | 6.7 km || 
|-id=769 bgcolor=#d6d6d6
| 138769 ||  || — || September 28, 2000 || Socorro || LINEAR || Tj (2.93) || align=right | 7.0 km || 
|-id=770 bgcolor=#d6d6d6
| 138770 ||  || — || September 28, 2000 || Socorro || LINEAR || URS || align=right | 6.1 km || 
|-id=771 bgcolor=#d6d6d6
| 138771 ||  || — || September 30, 2000 || Socorro || LINEAR || TIR || align=right | 7.0 km || 
|-id=772 bgcolor=#d6d6d6
| 138772 ||  || — || September 30, 2000 || Socorro || LINEAR || — || align=right | 6.5 km || 
|-id=773 bgcolor=#d6d6d6
| 138773 ||  || — || September 26, 2000 || Socorro || LINEAR || — || align=right | 10 km || 
|-id=774 bgcolor=#d6d6d6
| 138774 ||  || — || September 29, 2000 || Kitt Peak || Spacewatch || — || align=right | 5.1 km || 
|-id=775 bgcolor=#d6d6d6
| 138775 ||  || — || September 30, 2000 || Socorro || LINEAR || ALA || align=right | 10 km || 
|-id=776 bgcolor=#d6d6d6
| 138776 ||  || — || September 30, 2000 || Kitt Peak || Spacewatch || — || align=right | 4.5 km || 
|-id=777 bgcolor=#d6d6d6
| 138777 ||  || — || September 27, 2000 || Kitt Peak || Spacewatch || — || align=right | 4.9 km || 
|-id=778 bgcolor=#d6d6d6
| 138778 ||  || — || September 26, 2000 || Kitt Peak || Spacewatch || — || align=right | 5.7 km || 
|-id=779 bgcolor=#d6d6d6
| 138779 ||  || — || September 26, 2000 || Kitt Peak || Spacewatch || — || align=right | 3.8 km || 
|-id=780 bgcolor=#d6d6d6
| 138780 ||  || — || September 25, 2000 || Haleakala || NEAT || — || align=right | 5.6 km || 
|-id=781 bgcolor=#d6d6d6
| 138781 ||  || — || September 25, 2000 || Socorro || LINEAR || 7:4 || align=right | 8.4 km || 
|-id=782 bgcolor=#d6d6d6
| 138782 ||  || — || September 20, 2000 || Socorro || LINEAR || — || align=right | 5.6 km || 
|-id=783 bgcolor=#d6d6d6
| 138783 ||  || — || September 30, 2000 || Anderson Mesa || LONEOS || — || align=right | 7.9 km || 
|-id=784 bgcolor=#d6d6d6
| 138784 ||  || — || September 29, 2000 || Anderson Mesa || LONEOS || — || align=right | 5.4 km || 
|-id=785 bgcolor=#d6d6d6
| 138785 ||  || — || September 29, 2000 || Anderson Mesa || LONEOS || — || align=right | 7.3 km || 
|-id=786 bgcolor=#d6d6d6
| 138786 ||  || — || September 29, 2000 || Anderson Mesa || LONEOS || — || align=right | 4.5 km || 
|-id=787 bgcolor=#d6d6d6
| 138787 ||  || — || September 23, 2000 || Socorro || LINEAR || — || align=right | 11 km || 
|-id=788 bgcolor=#d6d6d6
| 138788 ||  || — || September 26, 2000 || Anderson Mesa || LONEOS || — || align=right | 6.4 km || 
|-id=789 bgcolor=#d6d6d6
| 138789 ||  || — || September 20, 2000 || Socorro || LINEAR || — || align=right | 5.3 km || 
|-id=790 bgcolor=#E9E9E9
| 138790 ||  || — || September 19, 2000 || Kitt Peak || Spacewatch || AGN || align=right | 2.1 km || 
|-id=791 bgcolor=#d6d6d6
| 138791 ||  || — || September 21, 2000 || Anderson Mesa || LONEOS || LIX || align=right | 5.2 km || 
|-id=792 bgcolor=#d6d6d6
| 138792 ||  || — || September 21, 2000 || Anderson Mesa || LONEOS || TIR || align=right | 4.7 km || 
|-id=793 bgcolor=#d6d6d6
| 138793 ||  || — || September 25, 2000 || Jodrell Bank || LONEOS || — || align=right | 3.6 km || 
|-id=794 bgcolor=#d6d6d6
| 138794 ||  || — || October 1, 2000 || Socorro || LINEAR || — || align=right | 5.3 km || 
|-id=795 bgcolor=#d6d6d6
| 138795 ||  || — || October 1, 2000 || Socorro || LINEAR || — || align=right | 3.5 km || 
|-id=796 bgcolor=#d6d6d6
| 138796 ||  || — || October 1, 2000 || Socorro || LINEAR || KOR || align=right | 2.0 km || 
|-id=797 bgcolor=#d6d6d6
| 138797 ||  || — || October 1, 2000 || Socorro || LINEAR || VER || align=right | 5.5 km || 
|-id=798 bgcolor=#d6d6d6
| 138798 ||  || — || October 1, 2000 || Socorro || LINEAR || — || align=right | 7.5 km || 
|-id=799 bgcolor=#d6d6d6
| 138799 ||  || — || October 1, 2000 || Socorro || LINEAR || — || align=right | 5.2 km || 
|-id=800 bgcolor=#d6d6d6
| 138800 ||  || — || October 1, 2000 || Socorro || LINEAR || EOS || align=right | 4.5 km || 
|}

138801–138900 

|-bgcolor=#fefefe
| 138801 ||  || — || October 1, 2000 || Socorro || LINEAR || MAS || align=right | 1.1 km || 
|-id=802 bgcolor=#d6d6d6
| 138802 ||  || — || October 3, 2000 || Socorro || LINEAR || — || align=right | 8.3 km || 
|-id=803 bgcolor=#d6d6d6
| 138803 ||  || — || October 6, 2000 || Anderson Mesa || LONEOS || — || align=right | 4.7 km || 
|-id=804 bgcolor=#d6d6d6
| 138804 ||  || — || October 6, 2000 || Anderson Mesa || LONEOS || — || align=right | 6.9 km || 
|-id=805 bgcolor=#d6d6d6
| 138805 ||  || — || October 1, 2000 || Socorro || LINEAR || EUP || align=right | 8.5 km || 
|-id=806 bgcolor=#d6d6d6
| 138806 ||  || — || October 1, 2000 || Socorro || LINEAR || — || align=right | 5.4 km || 
|-id=807 bgcolor=#d6d6d6
| 138807 ||  || — || October 1, 2000 || Socorro || LINEAR || — || align=right | 5.8 km || 
|-id=808 bgcolor=#d6d6d6
| 138808 ||  || — || October 1, 2000 || Socorro || LINEAR || — || align=right | 5.9 km || 
|-id=809 bgcolor=#d6d6d6
| 138809 ||  || — || October 1, 2000 || Socorro || LINEAR || LUT || align=right | 8.1 km || 
|-id=810 bgcolor=#d6d6d6
| 138810 ||  || — || October 1, 2000 || Anderson Mesa || LONEOS || — || align=right | 6.5 km || 
|-id=811 bgcolor=#d6d6d6
| 138811 ||  || — || October 1, 2000 || Socorro || LINEAR || THB || align=right | 9.4 km || 
|-id=812 bgcolor=#d6d6d6
| 138812 ||  || — || October 1, 2000 || Socorro || LINEAR || — || align=right | 3.8 km || 
|-id=813 bgcolor=#d6d6d6
| 138813 ||  || — || October 2, 2000 || Anderson Mesa || LONEOS || EOS || align=right | 3.3 km || 
|-id=814 bgcolor=#d6d6d6
| 138814 ||  || — || October 2, 2000 || Socorro || LINEAR || — || align=right | 4.4 km || 
|-id=815 bgcolor=#FFC2E0
| 138815 ||  || — || October 7, 2000 || Kitt Peak || Spacewatch || AMO +1km || align=right data-sort-value="0.87" | 870 m || 
|-id=816 bgcolor=#d6d6d6
| 138816 ||  || — || October 1, 2000 || Socorro || LINEAR || 7:4 || align=right | 5.4 km || 
|-id=817 bgcolor=#E9E9E9
| 138817 ||  || — || October 24, 2000 || Socorro || LINEAR || — || align=right | 6.6 km || 
|-id=818 bgcolor=#d6d6d6
| 138818 ||  || — || October 29, 2000 || Oaxaca || J. M. Roe || — || align=right | 3.7 km || 
|-id=819 bgcolor=#d6d6d6
| 138819 ||  || — || October 24, 2000 || Socorro || LINEAR || URS || align=right | 7.7 km || 
|-id=820 bgcolor=#d6d6d6
| 138820 ||  || — || October 24, 2000 || Socorro || LINEAR || — || align=right | 5.2 km || 
|-id=821 bgcolor=#d6d6d6
| 138821 ||  || — || October 24, 2000 || Socorro || LINEAR || HYG || align=right | 4.7 km || 
|-id=822 bgcolor=#d6d6d6
| 138822 ||  || — || October 24, 2000 || Socorro || LINEAR || LIX || align=right | 6.3 km || 
|-id=823 bgcolor=#d6d6d6
| 138823 ||  || — || October 24, 2000 || Socorro || LINEAR || — || align=right | 9.8 km || 
|-id=824 bgcolor=#d6d6d6
| 138824 ||  || — || October 25, 2000 || Socorro || LINEAR || — || align=right | 4.9 km || 
|-id=825 bgcolor=#d6d6d6
| 138825 ||  || — || October 29, 2000 || Kitt Peak || Spacewatch || — || align=right | 3.6 km || 
|-id=826 bgcolor=#d6d6d6
| 138826 ||  || — || October 24, 2000 || Socorro || LINEAR || LUT || align=right | 6.4 km || 
|-id=827 bgcolor=#E9E9E9
| 138827 ||  || — || October 24, 2000 || Socorro || LINEAR || — || align=right | 2.5 km || 
|-id=828 bgcolor=#d6d6d6
| 138828 ||  || — || October 24, 2000 || Socorro || LINEAR || — || align=right | 6.6 km || 
|-id=829 bgcolor=#d6d6d6
| 138829 ||  || — || October 25, 2000 || Socorro || LINEAR || — || align=right | 5.2 km || 
|-id=830 bgcolor=#d6d6d6
| 138830 ||  || — || October 25, 2000 || Socorro || LINEAR || THB || align=right | 4.9 km || 
|-id=831 bgcolor=#d6d6d6
| 138831 ||  || — || October 25, 2000 || Socorro || LINEAR || — || align=right | 9.0 km || 
|-id=832 bgcolor=#d6d6d6
| 138832 ||  || — || October 31, 2000 || Socorro || LINEAR || HYG || align=right | 4.8 km || 
|-id=833 bgcolor=#d6d6d6
| 138833 ||  || — || October 25, 2000 || Socorro || LINEAR || — || align=right | 6.9 km || 
|-id=834 bgcolor=#d6d6d6
| 138834 ||  || — || October 25, 2000 || Socorro || LINEAR || — || align=right | 6.1 km || 
|-id=835 bgcolor=#d6d6d6
| 138835 ||  || — || October 25, 2000 || Socorro || LINEAR || — || align=right | 3.8 km || 
|-id=836 bgcolor=#d6d6d6
| 138836 ||  || — || October 25, 2000 || Socorro || LINEAR || HYG || align=right | 6.5 km || 
|-id=837 bgcolor=#d6d6d6
| 138837 ||  || — || October 31, 2000 || Socorro || LINEAR || — || align=right | 3.4 km || 
|-id=838 bgcolor=#fefefe
| 138838 ||  || — || November 1, 2000 || Desert Beaver || W. K. Y. Yeung || — || align=right | 1.7 km || 
|-id=839 bgcolor=#d6d6d6
| 138839 ||  || — || November 1, 2000 || Socorro || LINEAR || THM || align=right | 5.4 km || 
|-id=840 bgcolor=#d6d6d6
| 138840 ||  || — || November 1, 2000 || Socorro || LINEAR || — || align=right | 6.8 km || 
|-id=841 bgcolor=#E9E9E9
| 138841 ||  || — || November 1, 2000 || Socorro || LINEAR || — || align=right | 4.2 km || 
|-id=842 bgcolor=#d6d6d6
| 138842 ||  || — || November 1, 2000 || Socorro || LINEAR || — || align=right | 6.6 km || 
|-id=843 bgcolor=#FA8072
| 138843 ||  || — || November 2, 2000 || Socorro || LINEAR || — || align=right data-sort-value="0.65" | 650 m || 
|-id=844 bgcolor=#d6d6d6
| 138844 ||  || — || November 1, 2000 || Socorro || LINEAR || — || align=right | 6.8 km || 
|-id=845 bgcolor=#E9E9E9
| 138845 ||  || — || November 3, 2000 || Socorro || LINEAR || — || align=right | 4.5 km || 
|-id=846 bgcolor=#FFC2E0
| 138846 ||  || — || November 2, 2000 || Socorro || LINEAR || APO +1km || align=right | 2.2 km || 
|-id=847 bgcolor=#FFC2E0
| 138847 ||  || — || November 3, 2000 || Socorro || LINEAR || AMO +1km || align=right data-sort-value="0.97" | 970 m || 
|-id=848 bgcolor=#fefefe
| 138848 ||  || — || November 16, 2000 || Kitt Peak || Spacewatch || — || align=right | 1.1 km || 
|-id=849 bgcolor=#d6d6d6
| 138849 ||  || — || November 17, 2000 || Socorro || LINEAR || Tj (2.95) || align=right | 10 km || 
|-id=850 bgcolor=#fefefe
| 138850 ||  || — || November 19, 2000 || Socorro || LINEAR || — || align=right | 1.3 km || 
|-id=851 bgcolor=#d6d6d6
| 138851 ||  || — || November 20, 2000 || Socorro || LINEAR || LIX || align=right | 7.2 km || 
|-id=852 bgcolor=#FFC2E0
| 138852 ||  || — || November 20, 2000 || Socorro || LINEAR || APO || align=right data-sort-value="0.32" | 320 m || 
|-id=853 bgcolor=#fefefe
| 138853 ||  || — || November 21, 2000 || Socorro || LINEAR || — || align=right | 1.1 km || 
|-id=854 bgcolor=#d6d6d6
| 138854 ||  || — || November 21, 2000 || Socorro || LINEAR || 7:4 || align=right | 4.8 km || 
|-id=855 bgcolor=#fefefe
| 138855 ||  || — || November 21, 2000 || Socorro || LINEAR || — || align=right | 1.1 km || 
|-id=856 bgcolor=#fefefe
| 138856 ||  || — || November 20, 2000 || Socorro || LINEAR || — || align=right | 1.5 km || 
|-id=857 bgcolor=#fefefe
| 138857 ||  || — || November 21, 2000 || Socorro || LINEAR || FLO || align=right | 1.6 km || 
|-id=858 bgcolor=#d6d6d6
| 138858 ||  || — || November 26, 2000 || Socorro || LINEAR || — || align=right | 8.2 km || 
|-id=859 bgcolor=#FFC2E0
| 138859 ||  || — || November 27, 2000 || Kitt Peak || Spacewatch || APO || align=right data-sort-value="0.57" | 570 m || 
|-id=860 bgcolor=#d6d6d6
| 138860 ||  || — || November 20, 2000 || Socorro || LINEAR || CRO || align=right | 6.0 km || 
|-id=861 bgcolor=#fefefe
| 138861 ||  || — || November 20, 2000 || Socorro || LINEAR || — || align=right | 1.9 km || 
|-id=862 bgcolor=#E9E9E9
| 138862 ||  || — || November 20, 2000 || Socorro || LINEAR || — || align=right | 3.7 km || 
|-id=863 bgcolor=#d6d6d6
| 138863 ||  || — || November 20, 2000 || Socorro || LINEAR || EUP || align=right | 6.9 km || 
|-id=864 bgcolor=#d6d6d6
| 138864 ||  || — || November 20, 2000 || Socorro || LINEAR || EUP || align=right | 8.1 km || 
|-id=865 bgcolor=#d6d6d6
| 138865 ||  || — || November 20, 2000 || Anderson Mesa || LONEOS || LUT || align=right | 7.9 km || 
|-id=866 bgcolor=#d6d6d6
| 138866 ||  || — || November 21, 2000 || Socorro || LINEAR || — || align=right | 4.1 km || 
|-id=867 bgcolor=#d6d6d6
| 138867 ||  || — || December 1, 2000 || Socorro || LINEAR || 7:4 || align=right | 9.1 km || 
|-id=868 bgcolor=#FA8072
| 138868 ||  || — || December 5, 2000 || Socorro || LINEAR || — || align=right | 1.0 km || 
|-id=869 bgcolor=#d6d6d6
| 138869 ||  || — || December 1, 2000 || Socorro || LINEAR || EOS || align=right | 2.9 km || 
|-id=870 bgcolor=#d6d6d6
| 138870 ||  || — || December 1, 2000 || Socorro || LINEAR || — || align=right | 6.5 km || 
|-id=871 bgcolor=#d6d6d6
| 138871 ||  || — || December 1, 2000 || Socorro || LINEAR || — || align=right | 8.9 km || 
|-id=872 bgcolor=#d6d6d6
| 138872 ||  || — || December 4, 2000 || Socorro || LINEAR || — || align=right | 4.7 km || 
|-id=873 bgcolor=#fefefe
| 138873 ||  || — || December 4, 2000 || Socorro || LINEAR || — || align=right | 3.7 km || 
|-id=874 bgcolor=#d6d6d6
| 138874 ||  || — || December 4, 2000 || Socorro || LINEAR || — || align=right | 7.0 km || 
|-id=875 bgcolor=#d6d6d6
| 138875 ||  || — || December 5, 2000 || Socorro || LINEAR || URS || align=right | 6.0 km || 
|-id=876 bgcolor=#d6d6d6
| 138876 ||  || — || December 5, 2000 || Socorro || LINEAR || EUP || align=right | 9.7 km || 
|-id=877 bgcolor=#FFC2E0
| 138877 ||  || — || December 15, 2000 || Socorro || LINEAR || APO +1km || align=right | 1.8 km || 
|-id=878 bgcolor=#d6d6d6
| 138878 ||  || — || December 18, 2000 || Kitt Peak || Spacewatch || — || align=right | 6.5 km || 
|-id=879 bgcolor=#fefefe
| 138879 ||  || — || December 19, 2000 || Socorro || LINEAR || — || align=right | 1.6 km || 
|-id=880 bgcolor=#fefefe
| 138880 ||  || — || December 20, 2000 || Socorro || LINEAR || — || align=right | 1.2 km || 
|-id=881 bgcolor=#E9E9E9
| 138881 ||  || — || December 21, 2000 || Kitt Peak || Spacewatch || — || align=right | 1.9 km || 
|-id=882 bgcolor=#fefefe
| 138882 ||  || — || December 20, 2000 || Socorro || LINEAR || FLO || align=right | 1.1 km || 
|-id=883 bgcolor=#FFC2E0
| 138883 ||  || — || December 26, 2000 || Haleakala || NEAT || APO +1km || align=right | 1.2 km || 
|-id=884 bgcolor=#fefefe
| 138884 ||  || — || December 30, 2000 || Socorro || LINEAR || FLO || align=right | 1.2 km || 
|-id=885 bgcolor=#fefefe
| 138885 ||  || — || December 30, 2000 || Socorro || LINEAR || — || align=right | 3.6 km || 
|-id=886 bgcolor=#fefefe
| 138886 ||  || — || December 30, 2000 || Socorro || LINEAR || — || align=right | 1.7 km || 
|-id=887 bgcolor=#fefefe
| 138887 ||  || — || December 30, 2000 || Socorro || LINEAR || — || align=right | 1.4 km || 
|-id=888 bgcolor=#fefefe
| 138888 ||  || — || December 30, 2000 || Socorro || LINEAR || FLO || align=right | 1.9 km || 
|-id=889 bgcolor=#fefefe
| 138889 ||  || — || December 30, 2000 || Socorro || LINEAR || FLO || align=right | 1.1 km || 
|-id=890 bgcolor=#d6d6d6
| 138890 ||  || — || December 30, 2000 || Socorro || LINEAR || EUP || align=right | 5.9 km || 
|-id=891 bgcolor=#fefefe
| 138891 ||  || — || December 30, 2000 || Socorro || LINEAR || — || align=right | 1.7 km || 
|-id=892 bgcolor=#fefefe
| 138892 ||  || — || December 30, 2000 || Socorro || LINEAR || — || align=right | 1.5 km || 
|-id=893 bgcolor=#FFC2E0
| 138893 ||  || — || December 30, 2000 || Socorro || LINEAR || APO +1km || align=right data-sort-value="0.84" | 840 m || 
|-id=894 bgcolor=#fefefe
| 138894 ||  || — || December 28, 2000 || Socorro || LINEAR || — || align=right | 1.8 km || 
|-id=895 bgcolor=#d6d6d6
| 138895 ||  || — || December 30, 2000 || Socorro || LINEAR || — || align=right | 3.5 km || 
|-id=896 bgcolor=#fefefe
| 138896 ||  || — || December 30, 2000 || Socorro || LINEAR || — || align=right | 1.7 km || 
|-id=897 bgcolor=#fefefe
| 138897 ||  || — || December 30, 2000 || Socorro || LINEAR || — || align=right | 1.6 km || 
|-id=898 bgcolor=#d6d6d6
| 138898 ||  || — || December 30, 2000 || Socorro || LINEAR || MEL || align=right | 8.0 km || 
|-id=899 bgcolor=#d6d6d6
| 138899 ||  || — || December 30, 2000 || Socorro || LINEAR || — || align=right | 5.5 km || 
|-id=900 bgcolor=#fefefe
| 138900 ||  || — || December 30, 2000 || Socorro || LINEAR || — || align=right | 1.4 km || 
|}

138901–139000 

|-bgcolor=#fefefe
| 138901 ||  || — || December 30, 2000 || Socorro || LINEAR || — || align=right | 1.6 km || 
|-id=902 bgcolor=#fefefe
| 138902 ||  || — || December 28, 2000 || Socorro || LINEAR || — || align=right | 1.5 km || 
|-id=903 bgcolor=#d6d6d6
| 138903 ||  || — || December 30, 2000 || Socorro || LINEAR || THM || align=right | 4.6 km || 
|-id=904 bgcolor=#d6d6d6
| 138904 ||  || — || December 30, 2000 || Socorro || LINEAR || HYG || align=right | 4.8 km || 
|-id=905 bgcolor=#fefefe
| 138905 ||  || — || December 30, 2000 || Socorro || LINEAR || FLO || align=right data-sort-value="0.96" | 960 m || 
|-id=906 bgcolor=#fefefe
| 138906 ||  || — || December 30, 2000 || Socorro || LINEAR || — || align=right | 1.5 km || 
|-id=907 bgcolor=#fefefe
| 138907 ||  || — || December 29, 2000 || Haleakala || NEAT || — || align=right | 1.6 km || 
|-id=908 bgcolor=#d6d6d6
| 138908 ||  || — || December 30, 2000 || Socorro || LINEAR || HYG || align=right | 6.4 km || 
|-id=909 bgcolor=#fefefe
| 138909 ||  || — || December 18, 2000 || Anderson Mesa || LONEOS || — || align=right | 1.8 km || 
|-id=910 bgcolor=#fefefe
| 138910 ||  || — || December 22, 2000 || Kitt Peak || Spacewatch || — || align=right | 1.6 km || 
|-id=911 bgcolor=#FFC2E0
| 138911 ||  || — || January 2, 2001 || Socorro || LINEAR || AMO || align=right data-sort-value="0.50" | 500 m || 
|-id=912 bgcolor=#d6d6d6
| 138912 ||  || — || January 2, 2001 || Socorro || LINEAR || — || align=right | 6.2 km || 
|-id=913 bgcolor=#fefefe
| 138913 ||  || — || January 2, 2001 || Socorro || LINEAR || FLO || align=right | 1.2 km || 
|-id=914 bgcolor=#fefefe
| 138914 ||  || — || January 2, 2001 || Socorro || LINEAR || — || align=right | 2.0 km || 
|-id=915 bgcolor=#fefefe
| 138915 ||  || — || January 2, 2001 || Socorro || LINEAR || — || align=right | 1.5 km || 
|-id=916 bgcolor=#fefefe
| 138916 ||  || — || January 2, 2001 || Socorro || LINEAR || FLO || align=right data-sort-value="0.95" | 950 m || 
|-id=917 bgcolor=#fefefe
| 138917 ||  || — || January 4, 2001 || Socorro || LINEAR || — || align=right | 1.2 km || 
|-id=918 bgcolor=#fefefe
| 138918 ||  || — || January 3, 2001 || Socorro || LINEAR || NYS || align=right | 1.2 km || 
|-id=919 bgcolor=#fefefe
| 138919 ||  || — || January 3, 2001 || Socorro || LINEAR || — || align=right | 2.7 km || 
|-id=920 bgcolor=#fefefe
| 138920 ||  || — || January 15, 2001 || Kitt Peak || Spacewatch || — || align=right | 1.1 km || 
|-id=921 bgcolor=#fefefe
| 138921 ||  || — || January 4, 2001 || Socorro || LINEAR || — || align=right | 1.4 km || 
|-id=922 bgcolor=#fefefe
| 138922 ||  || — || January 3, 2001 || Anderson Mesa || LONEOS || FLO || align=right | 1.3 km || 
|-id=923 bgcolor=#d6d6d6
| 138923 ||  || — || January 3, 2001 || Anderson Mesa || LONEOS || — || align=right | 5.6 km || 
|-id=924 bgcolor=#fefefe
| 138924 ||  || — || January 3, 2001 || Anderson Mesa || LONEOS || — || align=right | 1.3 km || 
|-id=925 bgcolor=#FFC2E0
| 138925 ||  || — || January 4, 2001 || Socorro || LINEAR || AMO +1km || align=right | 2.4 km || 
|-id=926 bgcolor=#fefefe
| 138926 || 2001 BA || — || January 16, 2001 || Oizumi || T. Kobayashi || — || align=right | 2.0 km || 
|-id=927 bgcolor=#fefefe
| 138927 || 2001 BR || — || January 17, 2001 || Oizumi || T. Kobayashi || FLO || align=right | 1.2 km || 
|-id=928 bgcolor=#fefefe
| 138928 ||  || — || January 16, 2001 || Kitt Peak || Spacewatch || — || align=right data-sort-value="0.86" | 860 m || 
|-id=929 bgcolor=#fefefe
| 138929 ||  || — || January 16, 2001 || Bergisch Gladbach || W. Bickel || — || align=right | 1.4 km || 
|-id=930 bgcolor=#fefefe
| 138930 ||  || — || January 18, 2001 || Socorro || LINEAR || — || align=right | 1.1 km || 
|-id=931 bgcolor=#E9E9E9
| 138931 ||  || — || January 18, 2001 || Socorro || LINEAR || — || align=right | 3.0 km || 
|-id=932 bgcolor=#d6d6d6
| 138932 ||  || — || January 19, 2001 || Socorro || LINEAR || — || align=right | 7.8 km || 
|-id=933 bgcolor=#d6d6d6
| 138933 ||  || — || January 19, 2001 || Socorro || LINEAR || — || align=right | 6.3 km || 
|-id=934 bgcolor=#fefefe
| 138934 ||  || — || January 19, 2001 || Socorro || LINEAR || FLO || align=right | 1.0 km || 
|-id=935 bgcolor=#E9E9E9
| 138935 ||  || — || January 20, 2001 || Kitt Peak || Spacewatch || MRX || align=right | 1.7 km || 
|-id=936 bgcolor=#fefefe
| 138936 ||  || — || January 21, 2001 || Socorro || LINEAR || — || align=right | 1.2 km || 
|-id=937 bgcolor=#FFC2E0
| 138937 ||  || — || January 19, 2001 || Socorro || LINEAR || APO +1km || align=right | 1.1 km || 
|-id=938 bgcolor=#fefefe
| 138938 ||  || — || January 19, 2001 || Socorro || LINEAR || — || align=right | 1.6 km || 
|-id=939 bgcolor=#fefefe
| 138939 ||  || — || January 19, 2001 || Socorro || LINEAR || — || align=right | 1.3 km || 
|-id=940 bgcolor=#fefefe
| 138940 ||  || — || January 20, 2001 || Socorro || LINEAR || FLO || align=right | 1.5 km || 
|-id=941 bgcolor=#fefefe
| 138941 ||  || — || January 20, 2001 || Socorro || LINEAR || NYS || align=right | 1.2 km || 
|-id=942 bgcolor=#d6d6d6
| 138942 ||  || — || January 20, 2001 || Socorro || LINEAR || — || align=right | 7.2 km || 
|-id=943 bgcolor=#fefefe
| 138943 ||  || — || January 20, 2001 || Socorro || LINEAR || — || align=right | 1.8 km || 
|-id=944 bgcolor=#fefefe
| 138944 ||  || — || January 20, 2001 || Socorro || LINEAR || V || align=right | 1.5 km || 
|-id=945 bgcolor=#fefefe
| 138945 ||  || — || January 21, 2001 || Socorro || LINEAR || — || align=right | 2.1 km || 
|-id=946 bgcolor=#fefefe
| 138946 ||  || — || January 19, 2001 || Kitt Peak || Spacewatch || NYS || align=right data-sort-value="0.86" | 860 m || 
|-id=947 bgcolor=#FFC2E0
| 138947 ||  || — || January 23, 2001 || Haleakala || NEAT || APO || align=right data-sort-value="0.45" | 450 m || 
|-id=948 bgcolor=#fefefe
| 138948 ||  || — || January 21, 2001 || Socorro || LINEAR || V || align=right | 1.3 km || 
|-id=949 bgcolor=#fefefe
| 138949 ||  || — || January 21, 2001 || Socorro || LINEAR || — || align=right | 1.5 km || 
|-id=950 bgcolor=#fefefe
| 138950 ||  || — || January 31, 2001 || Desert Beaver || W. K. Y. Yeung || — || align=right | 1.9 km || 
|-id=951 bgcolor=#fefefe
| 138951 ||  || — || January 29, 2001 || Socorro || LINEAR || FLO || align=right | 1.1 km || 
|-id=952 bgcolor=#fefefe
| 138952 ||  || — || January 29, 2001 || Socorro || LINEAR || FLO || align=right | 1.2 km || 
|-id=953 bgcolor=#fefefe
| 138953 ||  || — || January 31, 2001 || Socorro || LINEAR || — || align=right | 1.5 km || 
|-id=954 bgcolor=#fefefe
| 138954 ||  || — || January 28, 2001 || Haleakala || NEAT || — || align=right | 1.4 km || 
|-id=955 bgcolor=#fefefe
| 138955 ||  || — || January 29, 2001 || Kvistaberg || UDAS || — || align=right | 1.1 km || 
|-id=956 bgcolor=#fefefe
| 138956 ||  || — || January 24, 2001 || Socorro || LINEAR || V || align=right data-sort-value="0.92" | 920 m || 
|-id=957 bgcolor=#fefefe
| 138957 ||  || — || January 21, 2001 || Socorro || LINEAR || — || align=right | 1.1 km || 
|-id=958 bgcolor=#fefefe
| 138958 ||  || — || January 21, 2001 || Socorro || LINEAR || — || align=right | 1.4 km || 
|-id=959 bgcolor=#fefefe
| 138959 ||  || — || February 1, 2001 || Socorro || LINEAR || — || align=right | 1.7 km || 
|-id=960 bgcolor=#fefefe
| 138960 ||  || — || February 1, 2001 || Socorro || LINEAR || — || align=right | 1.4 km || 
|-id=961 bgcolor=#fefefe
| 138961 ||  || — || February 1, 2001 || Socorro || LINEAR || — || align=right | 1.6 km || 
|-id=962 bgcolor=#fefefe
| 138962 ||  || — || February 1, 2001 || Socorro || LINEAR || NYS || align=right | 1.2 km || 
|-id=963 bgcolor=#fefefe
| 138963 ||  || — || February 1, 2001 || Socorro || LINEAR || — || align=right | 1.2 km || 
|-id=964 bgcolor=#E9E9E9
| 138964 ||  || — || February 1, 2001 || Socorro || LINEAR || — || align=right | 3.4 km || 
|-id=965 bgcolor=#fefefe
| 138965 ||  || — || February 1, 2001 || Socorro || LINEAR || — || align=right | 2.7 km || 
|-id=966 bgcolor=#fefefe
| 138966 ||  || — || February 1, 2001 || Socorro || LINEAR || V || align=right | 1.2 km || 
|-id=967 bgcolor=#fefefe
| 138967 ||  || — || February 2, 2001 || Socorro || LINEAR || FLO || align=right | 1.2 km || 
|-id=968 bgcolor=#d6d6d6
| 138968 ||  || — || February 2, 2001 || Socorro || LINEAR || — || align=right | 4.6 km || 
|-id=969 bgcolor=#fefefe
| 138969 ||  || — || February 2, 2001 || Socorro || LINEAR || — || align=right | 1.2 km || 
|-id=970 bgcolor=#FA8072
| 138970 ||  || — || February 2, 2001 || Socorro || LINEAR || — || align=right | 1.4 km || 
|-id=971 bgcolor=#FFC2E0
| 138971 ||  || — || February 2, 2001 || Socorro || LINEAR || APOPHA || align=right data-sort-value="0.74" | 740 m || 
|-id=972 bgcolor=#fefefe
| 138972 ||  || — || February 1, 2001 || Anderson Mesa || LONEOS || — || align=right | 1.9 km || 
|-id=973 bgcolor=#fefefe
| 138973 ||  || — || February 1, 2001 || Anderson Mesa || LONEOS || — || align=right | 3.2 km || 
|-id=974 bgcolor=#fefefe
| 138974 ||  || — || February 1, 2001 || Socorro || LINEAR || NYS || align=right | 1.3 km || 
|-id=975 bgcolor=#fefefe
| 138975 ||  || — || February 1, 2001 || Socorro || LINEAR || NYS || align=right data-sort-value="0.95" | 950 m || 
|-id=976 bgcolor=#fefefe
| 138976 ||  || — || February 1, 2001 || Socorro || LINEAR || FLO || align=right | 1.4 km || 
|-id=977 bgcolor=#FA8072
| 138977 ||  || — || February 5, 2001 || Socorro || LINEAR || — || align=right | 1.0 km || 
|-id=978 bgcolor=#FA8072
| 138978 ||  || — || February 12, 2001 || Socorro || LINEAR || — || align=right | 4.7 km || 
|-id=979 bgcolor=#fefefe
| 138979 Černice ||  ||  || February 14, 2001 || Kleť || M. Tichý || — || align=right | 1.4 km || 
|-id=980 bgcolor=#fefefe
| 138980 ||  || — || February 14, 2001 || Ondřejov || L. Kotková || — || align=right data-sort-value="0.95" | 950 m || 
|-id=981 bgcolor=#C2FFFF
| 138981 ||  || — || February 13, 2001 || Kitt Peak || Spacewatch || L4 || align=right | 11 km || 
|-id=982 bgcolor=#fefefe
| 138982 ||  || — || February 2, 2001 || Haleakala || NEAT || — || align=right | 1.7 km || 
|-id=983 bgcolor=#fefefe
| 138983 ||  || — || February 16, 2001 || Socorro || LINEAR || FLO || align=right | 1.4 km || 
|-id=984 bgcolor=#fefefe
| 138984 ||  || — || February 16, 2001 || Črni Vrh || Črni Vrh || FLO || align=right | 1.0 km || 
|-id=985 bgcolor=#fefefe
| 138985 ||  || — || February 16, 2001 || Oizumi || T. Kobayashi || FLO || align=right | 1.6 km || 
|-id=986 bgcolor=#fefefe
| 138986 ||  || — || February 17, 2001 || Socorro || LINEAR || — || align=right | 1.6 km || 
|-id=987 bgcolor=#fefefe
| 138987 ||  || — || February 17, 2001 || Socorro || LINEAR || — || align=right | 1.4 km || 
|-id=988 bgcolor=#fefefe
| 138988 ||  || — || February 17, 2001 || Socorro || LINEAR || — || align=right | 1.4 km || 
|-id=989 bgcolor=#fefefe
| 138989 ||  || — || February 19, 2001 || Socorro || LINEAR || — || align=right | 1.4 km || 
|-id=990 bgcolor=#fefefe
| 138990 ||  || — || February 16, 2001 || Črni Vrh || Črni Vrh || KLI || align=right | 3.9 km || 
|-id=991 bgcolor=#fefefe
| 138991 ||  || — || February 16, 2001 || Socorro || LINEAR || FLO || align=right | 1.6 km || 
|-id=992 bgcolor=#fefefe
| 138992 ||  || — || February 16, 2001 || Socorro || LINEAR || FLO || align=right | 1.2 km || 
|-id=993 bgcolor=#fefefe
| 138993 ||  || — || February 16, 2001 || Socorro || LINEAR || V || align=right | 1.5 km || 
|-id=994 bgcolor=#fefefe
| 138994 ||  || — || February 16, 2001 || Socorro || LINEAR || — || align=right | 1.7 km || 
|-id=995 bgcolor=#fefefe
| 138995 ||  || — || February 17, 2001 || Socorro || LINEAR || — || align=right | 1.2 km || 
|-id=996 bgcolor=#fefefe
| 138996 ||  || — || February 17, 2001 || Socorro || LINEAR || EUT || align=right data-sort-value="0.95" | 950 m || 
|-id=997 bgcolor=#fefefe
| 138997 ||  || — || February 17, 2001 || Socorro || LINEAR || — || align=right | 1.4 km || 
|-id=998 bgcolor=#fefefe
| 138998 ||  || — || February 17, 2001 || Socorro || LINEAR || — || align=right | 1.1 km || 
|-id=999 bgcolor=#fefefe
| 138999 ||  || — || February 17, 2001 || Socorro || LINEAR || — || align=right | 1.2 km || 
|-id=000 bgcolor=#fefefe
| 139000 ||  || — || February 17, 2001 || Socorro || LINEAR || FLO || align=right | 1.2 km || 
|}

References

External links 
 Discovery Circumstances: Numbered Minor Planets (135001)–(140000) (IAU Minor Planet Center)

0138